= Outline of human anatomy =

Overview of and topical guide to human anatomy

The following outline is provided as an overview of and topical guide to human anatomy:

Human anatomy is the scientific study of the anatomy of the adult human. It is subdivided into gross anatomy and microscopic anatomy. Gross anatomy (also called topographical anatomy, regional anatomy, or anthropotomy) is the study of anatomical structures that can be seen by unaided vision. Microscopic anatomy is the study of minute anatomical structures assisted with microscopes, and includes histology (the study of the organization of tissues), and cytology (the study of cells).

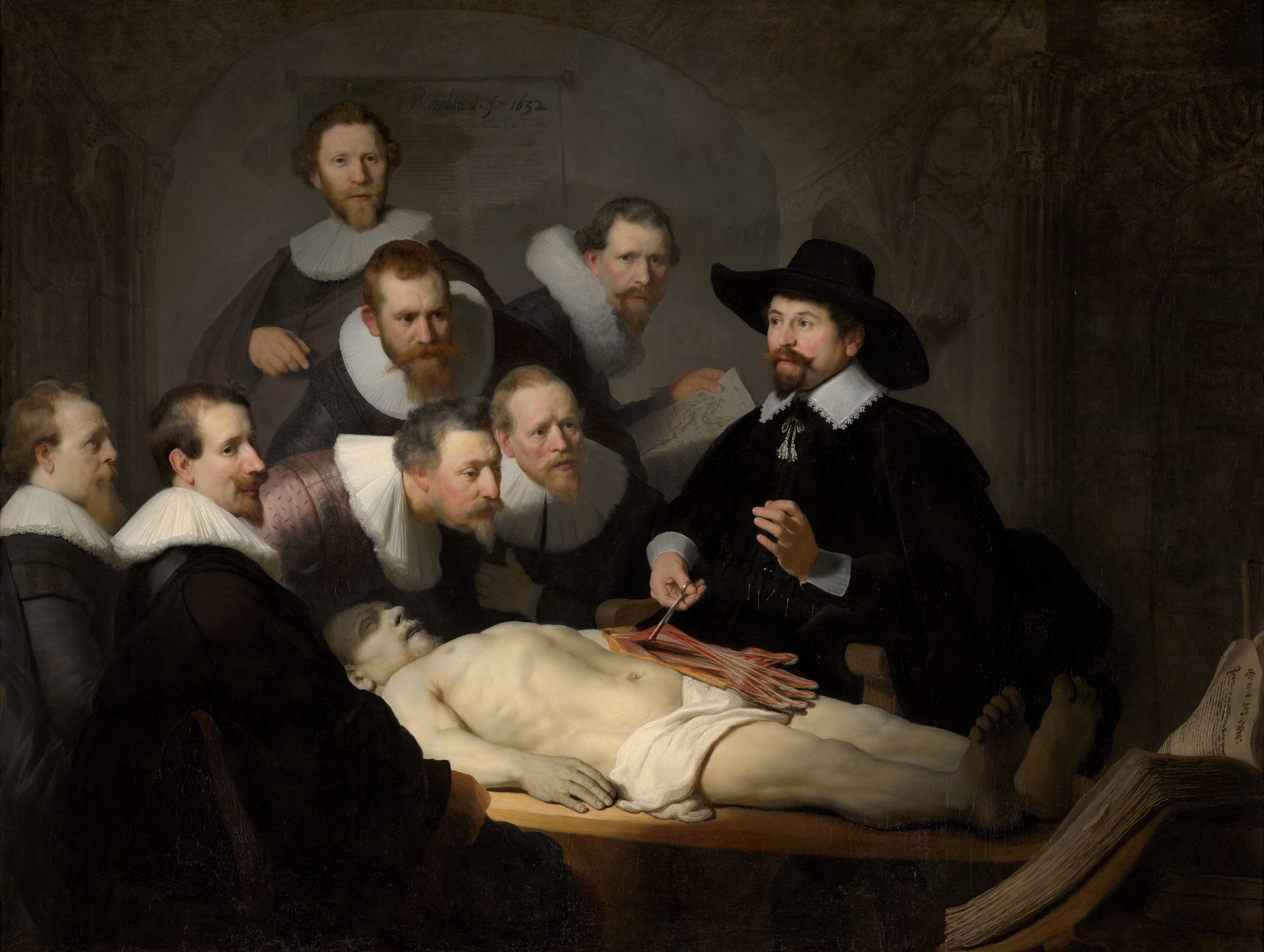
The Anatomy Lesson of Dr. Nicolaes Tulp, by Rembrandt; depicts an anatomy demonstration using a cadaver.

== Essence of human anatomy ==
- Human body
- Anatomy

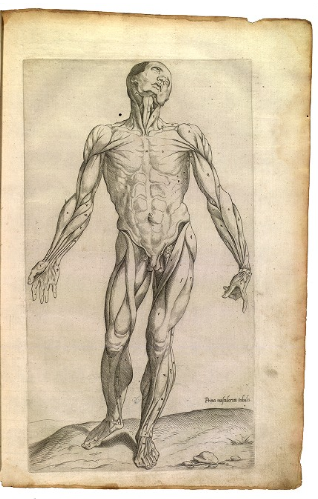
Front Muscles, illustrated in Compendiosa totius anatomie delineatio by Thomas Geminus, 1559. Anatomia

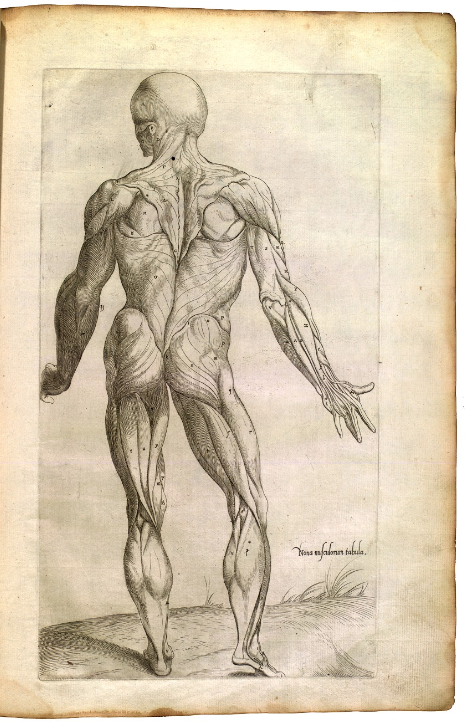
Back Muscles, illustrated in Compendiosa totius anatomie delineatio by Thomas Geminus, 1559. Anatomia

== Branches of human anatomy ==
- Gross anatomy - systemic or region-wise study of human body parts and organs. Gross anatomy encompasses cadaveric anatomy and osteology.
- Comparative anatomy - the study of evolution of species through similarities and differences in their anatomy.
- Microscopic anatomy (histology).
- Cell biology (cytology) and cytogenetics.
- Surface anatomy.
- Radiological anatomy.
- Developmental anatomy (embryology).

== Anatomy of the human body ==
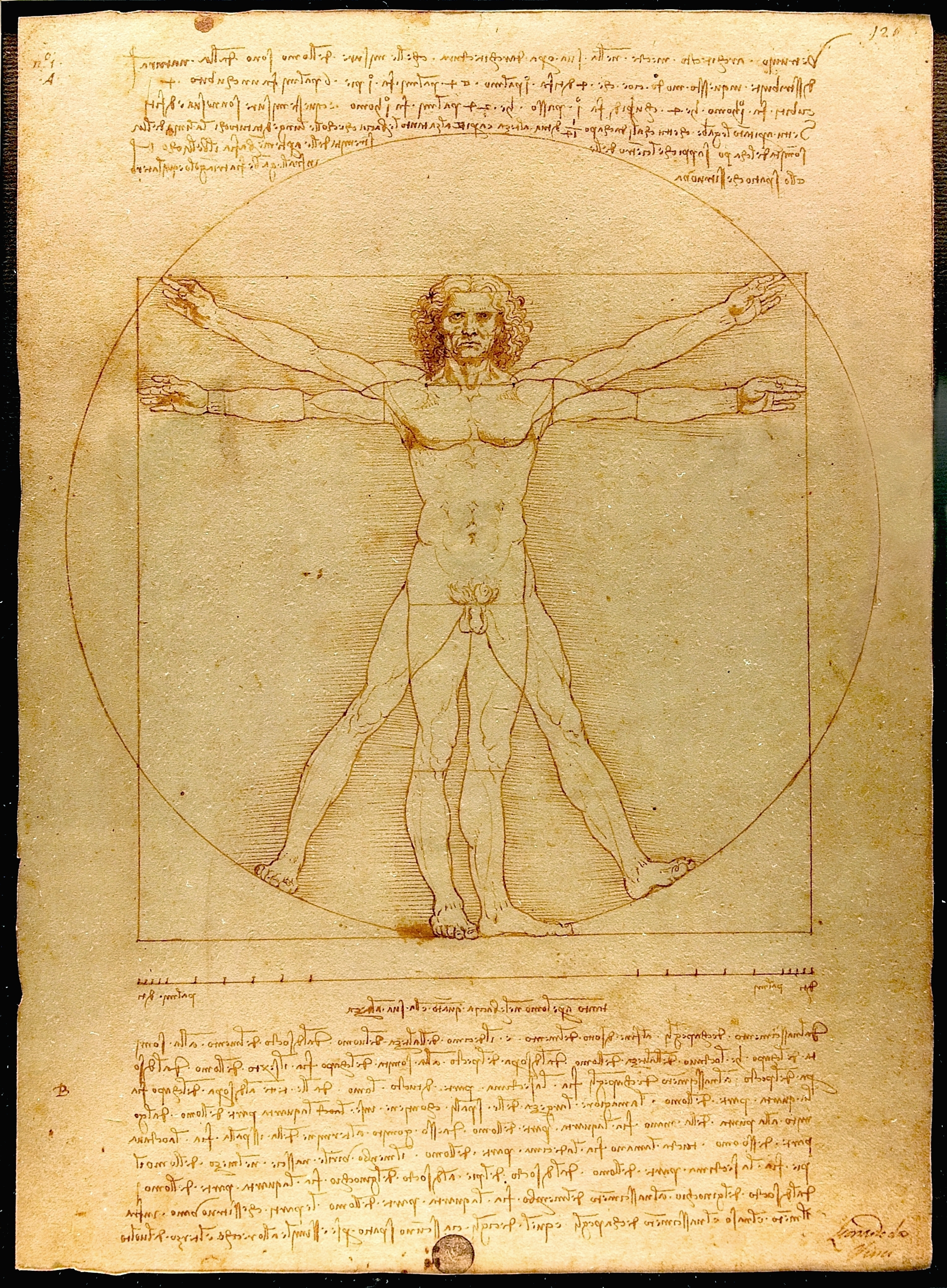
Leonardo da Vinci's Vitruvian Man (1492 CE)

The following list of human anatomical structures is based on the Terminologia Anatomica, the international standard for anatomical nomenclature. While the order is standardized, the hierarchical relationships in the TA are somewhat vague, and thus are open to interpretation.

=== General anatomy ===
- Parts of human body
  - Head
    - Ear
    - Face
    - Forehead
    - Cheek
    - Chin
    - Eye
    - Nose
    - Nostril
    - Mouth
    - Lip
    - Tongue
    - Tooth
  - Neck
  - Torso
    - Thorax
    - Abdomen
    - Pelvis
    - Back
    - Pectoral girdle
    - Shoulder
    - Arm
    - Axilla
    - Elbow
    - Forearm
    - Wrist
    - Hand
    - Finger
    - Thumb
    - Palm
  - Lower limb
    - Pelvic girdle
    - Leg
    - Buttocks
    - Hip
    - Thigh
    - Knee
    - Calf
    - Foot
    - Ankle
    - Heel
    - Toe
    - Big toe
    - Sole
  - Cavities
    - Cranial cavity
    - Spinal cavity
    - Thoracic cavity
    - Abdominopelvic cavity
      - Abdominal cavity
      - Pelvic cavity
- Planes, lines, and regions
  - Regions of head
  - Regions of neck
  - Anterior and lateral thoracic regions
  - Abdominal regions
  - Regions of back
  - Perineal regions
  - Regions of upper limb
  - Regions of lower limb

=== Bones ===
Diagram of an adult human skeleton
- General terms
  - Bony part
    - Cortical bone
    - Compact bone
    - Spongy bone
  - Cartilaginous part
  - Membranous part
    - Periosteum
    - Perichondrium
  - Axial skeleton
  - Appendicular skeleton
  - Long bone
  - Short bone
  - Flat bone
  - Irregular bone
  - Pneumatized bone
  - Sesamoid bone
  - Diaphysis
  - Epiphysis
    - Epiphysial plate (Growth plate)
  - Metaphysis
  - Apophysis
  - Tuber
  - Tubercle
  - Tuberosity
  - Eminence (anatomy)
  - Process
  - Condyle
  - Epicondyle
  - Fossa
  - Medullary cavity
  - Endosteum
  - Yellow bone marrow
  - Red bone marrow
  - Nutrient foramen
  - Nutrient canal
  - Ossification center
- Cranium
  - Neurocranium
  - Viscerocranium
  - Cranial cavity
  - Forehead
  - Occiput
  - Nasion
  - Bregma
  - Lambda
  - Inion
  - Pterion
  - Asterion
  - Gonion
  - Temporal fossa
  - Zygomatic arch
  - Infratemporal fossa
  - Pterygopalatine fossa
  - Pterygomaxillary fissure
  - Fontanelles
    - Anterior fontanelle
    - Posterior fontanelle
    - Sphenoidal fontanelle
    - Mastoid fontanelle
  - Calvaria
    - Vertex
    - Diploe
  - Cranial base
    - Internal surface of cranial base
      - Sphenopetrosal fissure
      - Petro-occipital fissure
      - Anterior cranial fossa
      - Middle cranial fossa
      - Posterior cranial fossa
        - Clivus
    - External surface of cranial base
      - Jugular foramen
      - Foramen lacerum
      - Bony palate
      - Greater palatine canal
      - Greater palatine foramen
      - Lesser palatine foramina
      - Incisive fossa
      - Incisive canals
      - Incisive foramina
  - Orbit
    - Orbital cavity
    - Medial wall
      - Anterior ethmoidal foramen
      - Posterior ethmoidal foramen
    - Superior orbital fissure
    - Inferior orbital fissure
  - Nasolacrimal canal
  - Bony nasal cavity
    - Piriform aperture
    - Superior nasal meatus
    - Middle nasal meatus
    - Inferior nasal meatus
    - Spheno-ethmoidal recess
    - Choana
    - Sphenopalatine foramen
  - Bones of cranium
    - Parietal bone
    - Frontal bone
      - Squamous part
        - External surface
          - Glabella
          - Frontal suture
          - Supra-orbital margin
            - Supra-orbital notch (Supra-orbital foramen)
        - Internal surface
          - Foramen cecum
      - Frontal sinus
    - Occipital bone
      - Foramen magnum
      - Occipital condyle
      - Condylar canal
      - Hypoglossal canal
      - Condylar fossa
      - Jugular tubercle
      - Jugular notch
      - Jugular process
      - External occipital protuberance
      - Superior nuchal line
      - Inferior nuchal line
      - Internal occipital protuberance
    - Sphenoid
      - Body
        - Sella turcica
          - Tuberculum sellae
          - Hypophysial fossa
          - Dorsum sellae
          - Posterior clinoid process
        - Sphenoidal sinus
      - Lesser wing
        - Optic canal
        - Anterior clinoid process
        - Superior orbital fissure
      - Greater wing
        - Foramen rotundum
        - Foramen ovale
        - Sphenoidal emissary foramen
        - Foramen spinosum
        - Foramen petrosum
        - Pterygoid process
        - Pterygoid notch
        - Pterygoid fossa
        - Scaphoid fossa
        - Pterygoid hamulus
        - Pterygoid canal
    - Temporal bone
      - Petrous part
        - Mastoid process
        - Occipital groove
        - Mastoid foramen
        - Facial canal
        - Inferior surface of petrous part
          - Styloid process
          - Stylomastoid foramen
        - Tympanic cavity
      - Mandibular fossa
      - Articular tubercle
        - Petrotympanic fissure
        - Petrosquamous fissure
    - Ethmoid
      - Cribriform plate
      - Cribriform foramina
      - Crista galli
      - Ethmoidal labyrinth
        - Ethmoidal bulla
    - Inferior nasal concha
    - Lacrimal bone
    - Nasal bone
    - Vomer
    - Maxilla
      - Body of maxilla
        - Orbital surface
          - Infra-orbital canal
          - Infra-orbital groove
        - Anterior surface
          - Infra-orbital foramen
        - Maxillary sinus
      - Palatine process
        - Incisive canals
      - Alveolar process
        - Dental alveoli
        - Incisive foramina
    - Palatine bone
    - Zygomatic bone
      - Zygomatico-orbital foramen
      - Zygomaticofacial foramen
      - Zygomaticotemporal foramen
    - Mandible
      - Body of mandible
        - Mental protuberance
        - Mental tubercle
        - Mental foramen
        - Oblique line
        - Superior mental spine
        - Inferior mental spine
        - Mylohyoid line
        - Sublingual fossa
        - Submandibular fossa
        - Alveolar part
          - Dental alveoli
      - Ramus of mandible
        - Angle of mandible
        - Mandibular foramen
          - Mandibular canal
        - Mylohyoid groove
        - Coronoid process
        - Mandibular notch
        - Condylar process
          - Pterygoid fovea
    - Hyoid bone
    - (Auditory ossicles - see sense organs)
- Vertebral column
  - Vertebral canal
  - Vertebra (this category contains parts of a vertebra)
    - Vertebral body
    - Vertebral arch
      - Pedicle
      - Lamina
    - Intervertebral foramen
    - Superior vertebral notch
    - Inferior vertebral notch
    - Vertebral foramen
    - Spinous process
    - Transverse process
  - Cervical vertebrae
    - Uncus of body
    - Foramen transversarium
    - Carotid tubercle
    - Atlas (anatomy)
    - Axis (anatomy)
      - Dens
    - Vertebra prominens (C7)
  - Thoracic vertebrae
  - Lumbar vertebrae
  - Sacrum
    - Dorsal surface
      - Sacral cornu
      - Sacral canal
        - Sacral hiatus
  - Coccyx
- Thoracic skeleton
  - Ribs
    - True ribs
    - False ribs
      - Floating ribs
    - Costal cartilage
  - Rib
    - Body
      - Costal groove
    - Cervical rib
    - First rib
      - Scalene tubercle
    - Lumbar rib
  - Sternum
    - Manubrium of sternum
      - Clavicular notch
      - Jugular notch
    - Sternal angle
    - Xiphoid process
  - Thoracic cage
    - Thoracic cavity
    - Superior thoracic aperture (thoracic inlet)
    - Inferior thoracic aperture
    - Intercostal space
    - Infrasternal angle
- Bones of upper limb
  - Pectoral girdle
    - Scapula
      - Acromion
      - Superior border
        - Suprascapular notch
      - Glenoid cavity
      - Supraglenoid tubercle
      - Infraglenoid tubercle
      - Coracoid process
    - Clavicle
      - Acromial end
        - Tuberosity for coracoclavicular ligament
          - Conoid tubercle
          - Trapezoid line
  - Free part of upper limb
    - Humerus
      - Greater tubercle
      - Lesser tubercle
        - Intertubercular sulcus
      - Shaft of humerus
        - Posterior surface
          - Radial groove
        - Deltoid tuberosity
      - Condyle of humerus
        - Capitulum
        - Trochlea
        - Olecranon fossa
        - Coronoid fossa
        - Radial fossa
      - Medial epicondyle
      - Lateral epicondyle
    - Radius
      - Radial styloid process
    - Ulna
      - Olecranon
      - Coronoid process
      - Head
        - Ulnar styloid process
  - Bones of hand
    - Carpal bones
      - Scaphoid
      - Lunate
      - Triquetrum
      - Pisiform
      - Trapezium
      - Trapezoid
      - Capitate
      - Hamate
    - Metacarpals
    - Phalanges (hand)
    - Sesamoid bones (hand)
- Bones of lower limb
  - Pelvic girdle
    - [Sacrum - see vertebrae section]
    - Hip bone
      - Acetabulum
      - Obturator foramen
      - Greater sciatic notch
      - Ilium
        - Arcuate line
        - Iliac crest
          - Anterior superior iliac spine
          - Anterior inferior iliac spine
          - Posterior superior iliac spine
          - Posterior inferior iliac spine
      - Ischium
        - Lesser sciatic notch MN
      - Pubis
        - Body
          - Pubic tubercle
        - Superior pubic ramus
          - Pecten pubis
    - Pelvis (category contains general terms)
      - Pelvic cavity
      - Pubic arch
      - Subpubic angle
      - Greater pelvis
      - Lesser pelvis
      - Linea terminalis
      - Pelvic inlet
      - Pelvic outlet
  - Free part of lower limb
    - Femur
      - Greater trochanter
      - Lesser trochanter
      - Intertrochanteric line
      - Intertrochanteric crest
      - Shaft of femur
        - Linea aspera
        - Pectineal line
      - Intercondylar fossa
    - Patella
    - Tibia
      - Medial malleolus
    - Fibula
      - Lateral malleolus
  - Bones of foot
    - Tarsal bones
      - Talus
      - Calcaneus
        - Sustentaculum tali
      - Navicular
      - Medial cuneiform
      - Intermediate cuneiform
      - Lateral cuneiform
      - Cuboid
    - Metatarsals
    - Phalanges (foot)
    - Sesamoid bones (foot)

=== Joints ===
- General terms
  - Joint
  - Bony joints
    - Synarthrosis
      - Fibrous joint
        - Syndesmosis
          - Gomphosis
        - Interosseous membrane
        - Suture
      - Cartilaginous joint
        - Synchondrosis
        - Symphysis
        - Epiphysial cartilage
    - Synovial joint
      - Articular disc
      - Meniscus
      - Synovial bursa
      - Synovial sheath
      - Plane joint
      - Cylindrical joint
        - Pivot joint
        - Hinge joint
      - Bicondylar joint
      - Saddle joint
      - Condylar joint
      - Ball and socket joint
  - Abduction
  - Adduction
  - External rotation or Lateral rotation
  - Internal rotation or Medial rotation
  - Circumduction
  - Flexion
  - Extension
  - Pronation
  - Supination
  - Opposition
  - Reposition
- Joints of the skull
  - Cranial fibrous joints
    - Cranial syndesmoses
    - Cranial sutures
      - Coronal suture
      - Sagittal suture
      - Lambdoid suture
    - Dento-alveolar syndesmosis (gomphosis)
  - Cranial cartilaginous joints
    - Cranial synchondroses
  - Cranial synovial joints
    - Temporomandibular joint
      - Sphenomandibular ligament
      - Stylomandibular ligament
    - Atlanto-occipital joint
- Vertebral joints
  - Syndesmoses of vertebral column
    - Interspinous ligaments
    - Ligamenta flava
    - Intertransverse ligaments
    - Supraspinous ligament
    - Ligamentum nuchae
    - Anterior longitudinal ligament
    - Posterior longitudinal ligament
    - Transverse ligaments
  - Synchondroses of vertebral column
    - Intervertebral joint
      - Intervertebral disc
        - Anulus fibrosus
        - Nucleus pulposus
  - Vertebral synovial joints
    - Median atlanto-axial joint
      - Alar ligaments
      - Apical ligament of dens
      - Cruciate ligament of dens
    - Lateral atlanto-axial joint
    - Zygapophysial joints
    - Lumbosacral joint
    - Sacrococcygeal joint
- Thoracic joints
  - Syndesmoses of thorax
    - External intercostal membrane
    - Internal intercostal membrane
  - Synchondroses of thorax
    - Costosternal joint
    - Synchondrosis of first rib
    - Sternal synchondroses
      - Xiphisternal joint
      - Manubriosternal joint
  - Synovial joints of thorax
    - Costovertebral joints
    - Sternocostal joints
    - Costochondral joints
    - Interchondral joints
- Joints of upper limb
  - Joints of pectoral girdle
    - Syndesmoses of pectoral girdle
      - Coraco-acromial ligament
      - Superior transverse scapular ligament
    - Synovial joints of pectoral girdle
      - Acromioclavicular joint
        - Acromioclavicular ligament
        - Coracoclavicular ligament
          - Trapezoid ligament
          - Conoid ligament
      - Sternoclavicular joint
  - Joints of free upper limb
    - Radio-ulnar syndesmosis
      - Interosseous membrane of forearm
    - Synovial joints of free upper limb
      - Glenohumeral joint
      - Elbow joint (since merged with elbow article)
        - Humeroulnar joint
        - Humeroradial joint
        - Proximal radio-ulnar joint
        - Ulnar collateral ligament
        - Radial collateral ligament
        - Anular ligament of radius
        - Quadrate ligament
      - Distal radio-ulnar joint
      - Joints of hand
        - Wrist joint
        - Carpal joints
          - Midcarpal joint
          - Radiate carpal ligament
          - Pisiform joint
            - Pisohamate ligament
            - Pisometacarpal ligament
        - Carpal tunnel
        - Ulnar canal
        - Carpometacarpal joints
          - Carpometacarpal joint of thumb
        - Intermetacarpal joints
        - Metacarpophalangeal joints
          - Deep transverse metacarpal ligament
        - Interphalangeal joints of hand
- Joints of lower limb
  - Joints of pelvic girdle
    - Syndesmoses of pelvic girdle
      - Obturator canal
      - Pubic symphysis
      - Sacro-iliac joint
        - Sacrotuberous ligament
        - Sacrospinous ligament
        - Greater sciatic foramen
        - Lesser sciatic foramen
  - Joints of free lower limb
    - Tibiofibular syndesmosis
      - Interosseous membrane of leg
    - Synovial joints of free lower limb
      - Hip joint
        - Iliofemoral ligament
        - Ischiofemoral ligament
        - Pubofemoral ligament
        - Transverse acetabular ligament
        - Ligament of head of femur
      - Knee joint
        - Lateral meniscus
        - Medial meniscus
        - Transverse ligament of knee
        - Anterior cruciate ligament
        - Posterior cruciate ligament
        - Fibular collateral ligament
        - Tibial collateral ligament
        - Oblique popliteal ligament
        - Arcuate popliteal ligament
        - Patellar ligament
      - Tibiofibular joint
      - Joints of foot
        - Ankle joint
          - Medial ligament (deltoid ligament)
          - Lateral ligaments
            - Anterior talofibular ligament
            - Posterior talofibular ligament
            - Calcaneofibular ligament.
        - Subtalar joint
        - Transverse tarsal joint
        - Cuneonavicular joint
        - Intercuneiform joints
        - Tarsal ligaments
          - Tarsal interosseous ligaments
          - Dorsal tarsal ligaments
          - Dorsal cuneonavicular ligament
          - Plantar tarsal ligaments
            - Plantar calcaneonavicular ligament (Spring ligament)
        - Tarsometatarsal joints
        - Intermetatarsal joints
        - Metatarsophalangeal joints
        - Interphalangeal joints of foot

=== Muscles ===
- General terms
  - Muscle
- Muscles of head
  - Extra-ocular muscles (see sense organs)
  - Muscles of auditory ossicles (see sense organs)
  - Facial muscles
    - Epicranius
    - Procerus
    - Nasalis
    - Depressor septi nasi
    - Orbicularis oculi
    - Corrugator supercilii
    - Depressor supercilii
    - Auricularis anterior
    - Auricularis superior
    - Auricularis posterior
    - Orbicularis oris
    - Depressor anguli oris
    - Transversus menti
    - Risorius
    - Zygomaticus major
    - Zygomaticus minor
    - Levator labii superioris
    - Levator labii superioris alaeque nasi
    - Depressor labii inferioris
    - Levator anguli oris
    - Modiolus
    - Buccinator
    - Mentalis
    - Masticatory muscles
      - Masseter
      - Temporalis
      - Lateral pterygoid
      - Medial pterygoid
  - Muscles of tongue - see alimentary system
  - Muscles of soft palate and fauces - see alimentary system
- Muscles of neck
  - Platysma
  - Longus colli
  - Longus capitis
  - Scalenus anterior
  - Scalenus medius
  - Scalenus posterior
  - Sternocleidomastoid
  - Suboccipital muscles
    - Rectus capitis anterior
    - Rectus capitis lateralis
    - Rectus capitis posterior major
    - Rectus capitis posterior minor
    - Obliquus capitis superior
    - Obliquus capitis inferior
  - Suprahyoid muscles
    - Digastric
    - Stylohyoid
    - Mylohyoid
    - Geniohyoid
  - Infrahyoid muscles
    - Sternohyoid
    - Omohyoid
    - Sternothyroid
    - Thyrohyoid
  - Cervical fascia
- Muscles of back
  - Trapezius
  - Latissimus dorsi
  - Rhomboid major
  - Rhomboid minor
  - Levator scapulae
  - Serratus posterior inferior
  - Serratus posterior superior
  - Anterior cervical intertransversarii
  - Lateral posterior cervical intertransversarii
  - Intertransversarii laterales lumborum
  - Muscles of back proper
    - Erector spinae
      - Erector spinae aponeurosis
      - Iliocostalis
      - Longissimus
      - Spinalis
    - Spinotransversales
      - Splenius
    - Transversospinales
      - Multifidus
      - Semispinalis
      - Rotatores
    - Interspinales
    - Intertransversarii
    - Thoracolumbar fascia
- Muscles of thorax
  - Pectoralis major
  - Pectoralis minor
  - Subclavius
  - Serratus anterior
  - Levatores costarum
  - External intercostal muscle
  - Internal intercostal muscle
  - Innermost intercostal muscle
  - Subcostales
  - Transversus thoracis
  - Pectoral fascia
  - Clavipectoral fascia
  - Thoracic fascia
  - Endothoracic fascia
  - Thoracic diaphragm
    - Lumbar part
      - Right crus of diaphragm
      - Left crus of diaphragm
      - Median arcuate ligament
      - Medial arcuate ligament
      - Lateral arcuate ligament
    - Aortic hiatus
    - Esophageal hiatus
    - Caval opening
- Muscles of abdomen
  - Rectus abdominis
  - Pyramidalis
  - External oblique
    - Inguinal ligament
  - Superficial inguinal ring
  - Internal oblique
    - Cremaster
  - Transversus abdominis
    - Inguinal falx
    - Deep inguinal ring
  - Linea alba
  - Linea semilunaris
  - Inguinal canal
  - Quadratus lumborum
  - Abdominal fascia
  - Pelvic fascia
  - Pelvic diaphragm
    - Levator ani
    - Ischiococcygeus
    - External anal sphincter
  - Perineal muscles - see genital systems
- Muscles of upper limb
  - Compartments
  - Muscles
    - Deltoid
    - Supraspinatus
    - Infraspinatus
    - Teres minor
    - Teres major
    - Subscapularis
    - Biceps brachii
    - Coracobrachialis
    - Brachialis
    - Triceps brachii
    - Anconeus
    - Pronator teres
    - Flexor carpi radialis
    - Palmaris longus
    - Flexor digitorum superficialis
    - Flexor digitorum profundus
    - Flexor pollicis longus
    - Pronator quadratus
    - Brachioradialis
    - Extensor carpi radialis longus
    - Extensor carpi radialis brevis
    - Extensor digitorum
    - Extensor digiti minimi
    - Extensor carpi ulnaris
    - Supinator
    - Abductor pollicis longus
    - Extensor pollicis brevis
    - Extensor pollicis longus
    - Extensor indicis
    - Palmaris brevis
    - Abductor pollicis brevis
    - Flexor pollicis brevis
    - Opponens pollicis
    - Adductor pollicis
    - Abductor digiti minimi
    - Flexor digiti minimi brevis
    - Opponens digiti minimi
    - Lumbricals of hand
    - Dorsal interossei (of hand)
    - Palmar interossei (of hand)
    - Fascia
      - Flexor retinaculum
- Muscles of lower limb
  - Compartments
  - Muscles
    - Iliopsoas
      - Iliacus
      - Psoas major
    - Gluteus maximus
    - Gluteus medius
    - Gluteus minimus
    - Tensor fasciae latae
    - Piriformis
    - Obturator internus
    - Gemellus superior
    - Gemellus inferior
    - Quadriceps femoris
      - Rectus femoris
      - Vastus lateralis
      - Vastus intermedius
      - Vastus medialis
    - Articularis genus
    - Pectineus
    - Adductor longus
    - Adductor brevis
    - Adductor magnus
    - Gracilis
    - Obturator externus
    - Biceps femoris
    - Semitendinosus
    - Semimembranosus
    - Tibialis anterior
    - Extensor digitorum longus
    - Fibularis tertius
    - Extensor hallucis longus
    - Fibularis longus
    - Fibularis brevis
    - Triceps surae
      - Gastrocnemius
      - Soleus
      - Calcaneal tendon
    - Plantaris
    - Popliteus
    - Tibialis posterior
    - Flexor digitorum longus
    - Flexor hallucis longus
    - Extensor hallucis brevis
    - Extensor digitorum brevis
    - Abductor hallucis
    - Flexor hallucis brevis
    - Adductor hallucis
    - Abductor digiti minimi
    - Flexor digiti minimi brevis
    - Flexor digitorum brevis
    - Quadratus plantae
    - Lumbricals
    - Dorsal interossei
    - Plantar interossei
    - Fascia
      - Fascia lata
        - Iliotibial tract
      - Adductor canal
      - Femoral canal
      - Femoral triangle
      - Femoral ring
      - Femoral septum
- Tendon sheaths and bursae
  - Bursae of neck
  - Bursae of upper limb
  - Tendinous sheaths of upper limb
  - Bursae of lower limb
  - Tendinous sheaths of lower limb

=== Alimentary system ===
- Mouth
  - Oral cavity
    - Oral vestibule
    - Oral cavity proper
  - Glands of mouth
    - Major salivary glands
      - Parotid gland
      - Sublingual gland
      - Submandibular gland
    - Minor salivary glands
  - Teeth
    - Incisor
    - Canine
    - Premolar
    - Molar
  - Tongue
    - Muscles of tongue
      - Genioglossus
      - Hyoglossus
      - Styloglossus
      - Superior longitudinal muscle
      - Inferior longitudinal muscle
      - Transverse muscle
      - Vertical muscle
      - Palatoglossus
- Uvula
- Fauces
  - Muscles of soft palate and fauces
    - Levator veli palatini
    - Tensor veli palatini
    - Musculus uvulae
    - Palatoglossus
    - Palatopharyngeus
- Pharynx
  - Nasopharynx
  - Oropharynx
  - Laryngopharynx
  - Pharyngeal muscles
    - Superior pharyngeal constrictor
    - Middle pharyngeal constrictor
    - Inferior pharyngeal constrictor
    - Stylopharyngeus
    - Salpingopharyngeus
    - Palatopharyngeus - see 'Muscles of soft palate and fauces'
- Esophagus
- Stomach
  - Pylorus
- Small intestine
  - Duodenum
  - Jejunum
  - Ileum
- Large intestine
  - Cecum
    - Appendix
  - Colon
    - Ascending colon
    - Transverse colon
    - Descending colon
    - Sigmoid colon
  - Rectum
  - Anus
    - Anal canal
      - Pectinate line
- Liver
  - Common hepatic duct
- Gall bladder
  - Cystic duct
  - Bile duct
- Pancreas
  - Pancreatic islets

=== Respiratory system ===
- Nose
  - Nasal cavity
    - Nasal septum
    - Spheno-ethmoidal recess
    - Superior nasal meatus
    - Middle nasal meatus
    - Inferior nasal meatus
  - Paranasal sinuses
    - Maxillary sinus
- Larynx
  - Laryngeal cartilages and joints
    - Thyroid cartilage
    - Cricoid cartilage
    - Cricothyroid joint
    - Arytenoid cartilage
    - Crico-arytenoid joint
    - Corniculate cartilage
    - Cuneiform cartilage
    - Epiglottis
    - Laryngeal muscles
      - Cricothyroid
    - Laryngeal cavity
      - Glottis
- Trachea
  - Carina of trachea
- Bronchi
- Lungs
  - Bronchopulmonary segments
    - Bronchioles

=== Thoracic cavity ===
Thoracic cavity

The thoracic cavity is the chamber of the body of vertebrates that is protected by the thoracic wall. The central compartment of the thoracic cavity is the mediastinum.

=== Urinary system ===
Urinary system

- Kidney
  - Nephrons
  - Renal arteries
  - Renal veins
  - Renal pelvis
- Ureter
- Urinary bladder
- Female urethra
- Male urethra

=== Genital systems ===
- Female reproductive system
  - Female internal genitalia
    - Ovary
      - Rete ovarii
      - Ligament
      - Suspensory ligament
    - Fallopian tube
    - Uterus
      - Cervix
      - Round ligament
      - Pubocervical ligament
      - Cardinal ligament
      - Uterosacral ligament
    - Vagina
    - Epoophoron
    - Paroophoron
    - Skene's glands
    - Bartholin's glands
  - Female external genitalia
    - Vulva
      - Mons pubis
      - Labia
        - Labium majus
          - Pudendal cleft
        - Labium minus
          - Fourchette
      - Vestibule
      - Clitoris
        - Glans
        - Frenulum
        - Body
          - Corpus cavernosum clitoridis
        - Root
          - Bulb
          - Crus
        - Clitoral hood
      - Urinary meatus
      - Vaginal introitus
      - Hymen
      - Vestibular gland openings
- Male reproductive system
  - Male internal genitalia
    - Testicle
      - Tunica vaginalis
      - Tunica albuginea
      - Seminiferous tubules
      - Straight tubules
      - Rete testis
    - Epididymis
    - Paradidymis
    - Spermatic cord
      - Cremaster
    - Vas deferens
    - Seminal vesicle
      - Ejaculatory duct
    - Prostate
    - Bulbourethral gland
  - Male external genitalia
    - Penis
      - Root
        - Bulb
        - Crus
      - Glans
        - Corona
        - Frenulum
      - Foreskin
      - Body
        - Corpus cavernosum penis
        - Corpus spongiosum penis
      - Helicine arteries
      - Fascia
        - Suspensory ligament
      - Urinary meatus
        - Spongy urethra
          - Navicular fossa
    - Scrotum
      - Dartos fascia
  - Perineum
    - Perineal body
    - Subcutaneous perineal pouch
    - Superficial perineal pouch
    - Deep perineal pouch
    - Ischio-anal fossa

=== Abdominopelvic cavity ===
Abdominopelvic cavity

- Extraperitoneal space
- Peritoneum
  - Mesentery
  - Mesocolon
    - Transverse mesocolon
    - Sigmoid mesocolon
    - Meso-appendix
  - Lesser omentum
    - Hepatophrenic ligament
    - Hepato-esophageal ligament
    - Hepatogastric ligament
    - Hepatoduodenal ligament
  - Greater omentum
    - Gastrophrenic ligament
    - Gastrosplenic ligament
    - Phrenicosplenic ligament
    - Splenorenal ligament
    - Pancreaticosplenic ligament
    - Pancreaticocolic ligament
    - Splenocolic ligament
    - Phrenicocolic ligament
  - Peritoneal attachments of liver
    - Coronary ligament
      - Falciform ligament
      - Right triangular ligament
      - Left triangular ligament
  - Recesses, fossae, and folds
    - Omental bursa
    - Paracolic gutters
    - Median umbilical fold
    - Medial umbilical fold
    - Inguinal triangle
    - Lateral umbilical fold
  - Urogenital peritoneum
    - Vesico-uterine pouch
    - Broad ligament of uterus
      - Mesometrium
      - Mesosalpinx
      - Mesovarium
      - Suspensory ligament of ovary - see genital systems

=== Endocrine glands ===
Endocrine system

- Pituitary gland
- Pineal gland
- Thyroid gland
- Suprarenal gland
- Pancreatic islets - see alimentary system

=== Cardiovascular system ===
Cardiovascular system

- General terms
  - Artery
- Heart
  - Chordae tendinae
  - Right atrium
  - Right ventricle
    - Tricuspid valve
  - Left atrium
  - Left ventricle
    - Mitral valve
  - Endocardium
  - Myocardium
  - Pericardial cavity
    - Transverse pericardial sinus
  - Pericardium
- Arteries
  - Pulmonary trunk
    - Right pulmonary artery
    - Left pulmonary artery
  - Aorta
    - Ascending aorta
      - Right coronary artery
      - Left coronary artery
    - Aortic arch
    - Brachiocephalic trunk
      - Thyroid ima artery
    - Common carotid artery
      - Carotid sinus
    - External carotid artery
      - Superior thyroid artery
      - Ascending pharyngeal artery
      - Lingual artery
      - Facial artery
        - Ascending palatine artery
        - Submental artery
        - Angular artery
      - Occipital artery
      - Posterior auricular artery
      - Superficial temporal artery
        - Transverse facial artery
        - Zygomatico-orbital artery
        - Middle temporal artery
      - Maxillary artery
        - Deep auricular artery
        - Anterior tympanic artery
        - Inferior alveolar artery
        - Middle meningeal artery
          - Superior tympanic artery
        - Pterygomandibular artery
        - Masseteric artery
        - Anterior deep temporal artery
        - Posterior deep temporal artery
        - Buccal artery
        - Posterior superior alveolar artery
        - Infra-orbital artery
          - Anterior superior alveolar arteries
        - Artery of pterygoid canal
        - Descending palatine artery
          - Greater palatine artery
          - Lesser palatine arteries
        - Sphenopalatine artery
    - Internal carotid artery
      - Ophthalmic artery
        - Central retinal artery
        - Lacrimal artery
        - Short posterior ciliary arteries
        - Long posterior ciliary arteries
        - Supra-orbital artery
        - Anterior ethmoidal artery
        - Posterior ethmoidal artery
        - Supratrochlear artery
        - Dorsal nasal artery
    - Arteries of brain
      - Anterior choroidal artery
      - Anterior cerebral artery
        - Anterior communicating artery
      - Middle cerebral artery
      - Posterior communicating artery
      - Cerebral arterial circle (Willis)
      - Posterior cerebral artery
    - Subclavian artery
      - Vertebral artery
        - Basilar artery
      - Internal thoracic artery
        - Pericardiophrenic artery
        - Musculophrenic artery
        - Superior epigastric artery
      - Thyrocervical trunk
        - Inferior thyroid artery
        - Ascending cervical artery
        - Suprascapular artery
        - Transverse cervical artery
      - Dorsal scapular artery
      - Costocervical trunk
        - Deep cervical artery
        - Supreme intercostal artery
    - Arteries of upper limb
      - Axillary artery
        - Superior thoracic artery
        - Thoraco-acromial artery
        - Lateral thoracic artery
        - Subscapular artery
          - Thoracodorsal artery
          - Circumflex scapular artery
        - Anterior circumflex humeral artery
        - Posterior circumflex humeral artery
      - Brachial artery
        - Profunda brachii artery
      - Radial artery
        - Princeps pollicis artery
        - Radialis indicis artery
        - Deep palmar arch
      - Ulnar artery
        - Superficial palmar arch
    - Thoracic aorta
      - Posterior intercostal arteries
      - Subcostal artery
    - Abdominal aorta
      - Inferior phrenic artery
      - Lumbar arteries
      - Median sacral artery
      - Celiac trunk
        - Left gastric artery
        - Common hepatic artery
          - Gastroduodenal artery
            - Posterior superior pancreaticoduodenal artery
            - Right gastro-omental artery
            - Anterior superior pancreaticoduodenal artery
        - Right gastric artery
        - Hepatic artery proper
          - Right branch
            - Cystic artery
        - Splenic artery
        - Left gastro-omental artery
        - Short gastric arteries
      - Superior mesenteric artery
        - Inferior pancreaticoduodenal artery
        - Ileocolic artery
        - Right colic artery
        - Middle colic artery
      - Inferior mesenteric artery
        - Left colic artery
        - Sigmoid arteries
        - Superior rectal artery
      - Middle suprarenal artery
      - Renal artery
      - Ovarian artery
      - Testicular artery
    - Common iliac artery
    - Internal iliac artery
      - Iliolumbar artery
      - Lateral sacral arteries
      - Obturator artery
      - Superior gluteal artery
      - Inferior gluteal artery
      - Umbilical artery
        - Superior vesical arteries
      - Inferior vesical artery
      - Uterine artery
      - Vaginal artery
      - Middle rectal artery
      - Internal pudendal artery
        - Inferior rectal artery
        - Perineal artery
    - Arteries of lower limb
      - External iliac artery
        - Inferior epigastric artery
          - Cremasteric artery
          - Artery of round ligament of uterus
      - Femoral artery
      - Deep artery of thigh
      - Popliteal artery
      - Anterior tibial artery
      - Dorsalis pedis artery
      - Posterior tibial artery
      - Medial plantar artery
      - Lateral plantar artery
      - Fibular artery
- Veins
  - Veins of heart
    - Coronary sinus
      - Great cardiac vein
      - Oblique vein of left atrium
      - Middle cardiac vein
      - Small cardiac vein
  - Pulmonary veins
  - Superior vena cava
    - Brachiocephalic vein
      - Inferior thyroid vein
      - Inferior laryngeal vein
      - Pericardial veins
      - Pericardiophrenic veins
      - Bronchial veins
      - Vertebral vein
        - Occipital vein
        - Anterior vertebral vein
      - Deep cervical vein
      - Internal thoracic veins
        - Superior epigastric veins
        - Musculophrenic veins
        - Anterior intercostal veins
      - Supreme intercostal vein
    - Internal jugular vein
      - Lingual vein
        - Dorsal lingual veins
        - Sublingual vein
        - Deep lingual vein
      - Superior thyroid vein
      - Middle thyroid veins
      - Sternocleidomastoid vein
      - Superior laryngeal vein
      - Facial vein
        - Angular vein
        - Supratrochlear veins
        - Supra-orbital vein
        - External nasal veins
        - Deep facial vein
        - External palatine vein
        - Submental vein
      - Retromandibular vein
        - Superficial temporal veins
        - Middle temporal vein
        - Transverse facial vein
        - Maxillary veins
        - Pterygoid plexus
      - External jugular vein
        - Posterior auricular vein
        - Anterior jugular vein
        - Suprascapular vein
        - Transverse cervical veins
      - Dural venous sinuses
        - Transverse sinus
        - Confluence of sinuses
        - Marginal sinus
        - Occipital sinus
        - Petrosquamous sinus
        - Sigmoid sinus
        - Superior sagittal sinus
        - Inferior sagittal sinus
        - Straight sinus
        - Inferior petrosal sinus
        - Superior petrosal sinus
        - Cavernous sinus
        - Sphenoparietal sinus
      - Diploic veins
      - Emissary veins
    - Cerebral veins
      - Superficial cerebral veins
      - Deep cerebral veins
        - Basal vein
        - Great cerebral vein
      - Veins of brainstem
      - Cerebellar veins
    - Orbital veins
      - Superior ophthalmic vein
        - Nasofrontal vein
        - Ethmoidal veins
        - Lacrimal vein
        - Vorticose veins
        - Ciliary veins
        - Central retinal vein
        - Episcleral vein
      - Inferior ophthalmic vein
    - Azygos vein
      - Posterior intercostal veins
        - Intervertebral vein
      - Veins of vertebral column
        - Anterior internal vertebral venous plexus
          - Basivertebral veins
          - Anterior spinal veins
          - Posterior spinal veins
    - Veins of upper limb
      - Subclavian vein
      - Axillary vein
        - Subscapular vein
        - Circumflex scapular vein
          - Thoracodorsal vein
          - Posterior circumflex humeral vein
          - Anterior circumflex humeral vein
        - Lateral thoracic vein
      - Superficial veins of upper limb
        - Cephalic vein
        - Basilic vein
        - Median cubital vein
        - Dorsal venous network of hand
      - Deep veins of upper limb
        - Brachial veins
        - Ulnar veins
        - Radial veins
  - Inferior vena cava
    - Inferior phrenic veins
    - Lumbar veins
    - Ascending lumbar vein
    - Hepatic veins
    - Renal veins
      - Left suprarenal vein
      - Left ovarian vein
      - Left testicular vein
    - Right suprarenal vein
    - Right ovarian vein
    - Right testicular vein
      - Pampiniform plexus
    - Common iliac vein
      - Median sacral vein
      - Iliolumbar vein
    - Internal iliac vein
      - Superior gluteal veins
      - Inferior gluteal veins
      - Obturator veins
      - Lateral sacral veins
      - Vesical veins
      - Middle rectal veins
      - Internal pudendal vein
        - Deep veins of clitoris
        - Deep veins of penis
        - Inferior rectal veins
      - Posterior labial veins
      - Posterior scrotal veins
    - External iliac vein
      - Inferior epigastric vein
      - Deep circumflex iliac vein
    - Veins of lower limb
      - Superficial veins of lower limb
        - Great saphenous vein
          - External pudendal veins
        - Small saphenous vein
      - Deep veins of lower limb
        - Femoral vein
        - Profunda femoris vein
        - Popliteal vein
          - Sural veins
          - Anterior tibial veins
          - Posterior tibial veins
            - Fibular veins
  - Hepatic portal vein
    - Cystic vein
    - Para-umbilical veins
    - Left gastric vein
    - Right gastric vein
    - Superior mesenteric vein
      - Right gastro-omental vein
      - Ileocolic vein
        - Appendicular vein
      - Right colic vein
      - Middle colic vein
    - Splenic vein
      - Left gastro-omental vein
      - Inferior mesenteric vein
        - Left colic vein
        - Sigmoid veins
        - Superior rectal vein
- Lymphatic trunks and ducts
  - Thoracic duct
  - Cisterna chyli

=== Lymphoid system ===
Lymphatic system

- Primary lymphoid organs
  - Bone marrow
  - Thymus
- Secondary lymphoid organs
  - Spleen
  - Pharyngeal lymphoid ring
  - Lymph node
- Regional lymph nodes
  - Lymph nodes of head and neck
  - Lymph nodes of upper limb
  - Thoracic lymph nodes
  - Abdominal lymph nodes
  - Pelvic lymph nodes
  - Lymph nodes of lower limb

=== Nervous system ===
- Central nervous system
- Peripheral nervous system
- Autonomic nervous system

=== Sense organs ===
- Olfactory organ
- Eye and related structures
  - Eyeball
    - Fibrous layer of eyeball
      - Sclera
      - Cornea
    - Vascular layer of eyeball
      - Choroid
      - Ciliary body
        - Ciliary processes
        - Ciliary muscle
      - Iris
        - Pupil
    - Inner layer of eyeball
      - Retina
        - Ora serrata
        - Optic disc
        - Macula
          - Fovea centralis
      - Optic nerve (see nervous system)
      - Retinal blood vessels (see cardiovascular system)
    - Lens
    - Chambers of eyeball
      - Aqueous humor
      - Vitreous humor
  - Accessory visual structures
    - Extra-ocular muscles
      - Orbitalis
      - Superior rectus
      - Inferior rectus
      - Medial rectus
      - Lateral rectus
      - Common tendinous ring
      - Superior oblique
      - Inferior oblique
      - Levator palpebrae superioris
    - Eyebrow
    - Eyelids
      - Palpebral fissure
      - Eyelash
      - Superior tarsus
      - Inferior tarsus
      - Tarsal glands
      - Ciliary glands
    - Conjunctiva
      - Lacrimal caruncle
    - Lacrimal apparatus
      - Lacrimal gland
      - Lacus lacrimalis
      - Lacrimal papilla
      - Lacrimal punctum
      - Lacrimal canaliculus
      - Lacrimal sac
      - Nasolacrimal duct
- Ear
  - External ear
    - Auricle
      - Antitragus
      - Tragus
    - Ligaments of auricle
    - Auricular muscles
      - Helicis major
      - Helicis minor
      - Tragicus
      - Pyramidal muscle of auricle
      - Antitragicus
      - Transverse muscle of auricle
      - Oblique muscle of auricle
    - External acoustic meatus
    - Tympanic membrane
      - Umbo of tympanic membrane
  - Middle ear
    - Tympanic cavity
      - Labyrinthine wall (medial wall)
        - Oval window
        - Sinus tympani
        - Round window
      - Mastoid wall (posterior wall)
        - Aditus to mastoid antrum
        - Pyramidal eminence
      - Mastoid antrum
    - Auditory ossicles
      - Stapes
      - Incus
      - Malleus
    - Articulations of auditory ossicles
      - Ligaments of auditory ossicles
    - Muscles of auditory ossicles
      - Tensor tympani
      - Stapedius
    - Pharyngotympanic tube
  - Inner ear
    - Bony labyrinth
      - Semicircular canals
      - Cochlea
        - Modiolus
        - Scala vestibuli
        - Helicotrema
        - Scala tympani
      - Internal acoustic meatus - see bones
      - Perilymphatic space
    - Membranous labyrinth
      - Endolymphatic space
    - Vestibular labyrinth
      - Utricle
      - Saccule
      - Semicircular ducts
      - Utriculosaccular duct
      - Endolymphatic duct
    - Cochlear labyrinth
      - Cochlear duct
        - Spiral organ
        - Spiral ganglion
    - Vessels of inner ear
- Gustatory organ
  - Taste bud

=== The integument ===
Integumentary system

- Skin
  - Epidermis
  - Dermis
    - Hairs
    - Downy hair (Lanugo)
    - Skin glands
      - Sweat gland
      - Sebaceous gland
  - Nail
    - Lunule
  - Breast
    - Nipple
    - Mammary gland
      - Lactiferous duct
      - Lactiferous sinus
      - Areola
    - Suspensory ligaments of breast
- Subcutaneous tissue

== History of human anatomy ==
- History of anatomy.
- Edwin Smith Papyrus - earliest known treatise on anatomy, from ancient Egypt circa 1600 BCE.

== Organizations ==
- American Association of Anatomists
- American Association of Clinical Anatomists
- British Association of Clinical Anatomists
- International Federation of Associations of Anatomists
- Anatomical Society of India
- Society of Clinical Anatomists, India
- Australia and New Zealand Association of Clinical Anatomists

== Anatomists ==
- Benjamin Alcock
- Frank Netter
- Jean Astruc
- Patricia Bergquist
- Vincent Bochdalek
- James Dixon Boyd
- Philipp Bozzini
- Geoffrey Bourne
- John Browne
- Charaka
- Johann Conrad Brunner
- William Cheselden
- William Cowper
- Max Fürbringer
- Antoni de Gimbernat
- Friedrich Goll
- Leonardo da Vinci
- Edwin Stephen Goodrich
- Gaspard Goyrand
- George Gulliver
- Gunther von Hagens
- Arthur Ham
- Hippocrates
- Wilhelm His Sr.
- John Hunter
- William Hunter
- Jean Baptiste Paulin Trolard
- Juan Valverde de Amusco
- Jeffrey Laitman
- Eber Landau
- Joseph Lieutaud
- Amato Lusitano
- Niko Miljanić
- Keith L. Moore
- Leo Testut
- Henri Rouvière
- Lennart Olsson
- Bronislaw Onuf-Onufrowicz
- William Charles Osman Hill
- Johann Conrad Peyer
- Prosector
- Santiago Ramón y Cajal
- Anders Retzius
- Luigi Rolando
- Olaus Rudbeck
- William Shippen
- Adriaan van den Spiegel
- Edward Charles Spitzka
- Ludwik Teichmann
- Andreas Vesalius
- Johann Gottlieb Walter
- Thomas Wharton
- Johann Winter von Andernach
- Henry Gray
- Madhusudan Gupta

== See also ==
- Outline of biology
- Outline of medicine
- Outline of health
- Outline of health sciences
- Physiology
- Human body
