= List of arteries of the human body =

This is a list of arteries of the human body.

- The aorta
- The arteries of the head and neck
  - The common carotid artery
    - The external carotid artery
    - The triangles of the neck
    - The internal carotid artery
  - The arteries of the brain
- The arteries of the upper extremity
  - The subclavian artery
  - The axilla
    - The axillary artery
    - The brachial artery
    - The radial artery
    - The ulnar artery
- The arteries of the trunk
  - The descending aorta
    - The thoracic aorta
    - The abdominal aorta
  - The common iliac arteries
    - The hypogastric artery
    - The external iliac artery
- The arteries of the lower extremity
  - The femoral artery
  - The popliteal artery
  - The anterior tibial artery
  - The arteria dorsalis pedis
  - The posterior tibial artery

== Position of artery ==
Ascending aorta
Aortic arch
Descending aorta (Thorax)
Abdominal aorta
L common iliac a
External iliac a
Femoral a
Popliteal a
Anterior tibial a
Dorsalis pedis a

Left coronary artery
Right coronary artery
Brachiocephalic a
L common carotid a
L subclavian a
Bronchial as
Celiac a
SMA
Renal as
IMA
R common iliac a
Internal iliac a
Profunda femoris a
Peroneal a
Posterior tibial a

LAD
Circumflex a
R common carotid a
R subclavian a
Internal carotid a
External carotid a
Vertebral artery
Int. thoracic a
Thyrocervical trunk
Costocervical trunk
Dorsal scapular artery (mostly)
L gastric a
Common hepatic a
Splenic a
