= Scalene =

Scalene may refer to:

- A scalene triangle, one in which no two sides or angles are the same.
- A scalene ellipsoid, one in which the lengths of all three semi-principal axes are different
- Scalene muscles of the neck
- Scalene tubercle, a slight ridge on the first rib prolonged internally into a tubercle
