= Transverse artery =

Transverse artery may refer to

- Suprascapular artery (or transverse scapular artery)
- Transverse cervical artery
- Transverse facial artery
