= Scapular artery =

Scapular artery can refer to:

- Circumflex scapular artery
- Dorsal scapular artery
- Suprascapular artery, also known as transverse scapular artery
