= Dorsal scapular =

Dorsal scapular may refer to:

- Dorsal scapular nerve
- Dorsal scapular artery
- Dorsal scapular vein
