= Cervical vein =

Cervical vein may refer to:

- Deep cervical vein
- Transverse cervical veins
