= Deep cervical =

Deep cervical may refer to:

- Deep cervical artery
- Deep cervical fascia
- Deep cervical glands
- Deep cervical lymph nodes
- Deep cervical vein
