= Aberrant subclavian artery =

- Other names: Aberrant subclavian artery syndrome
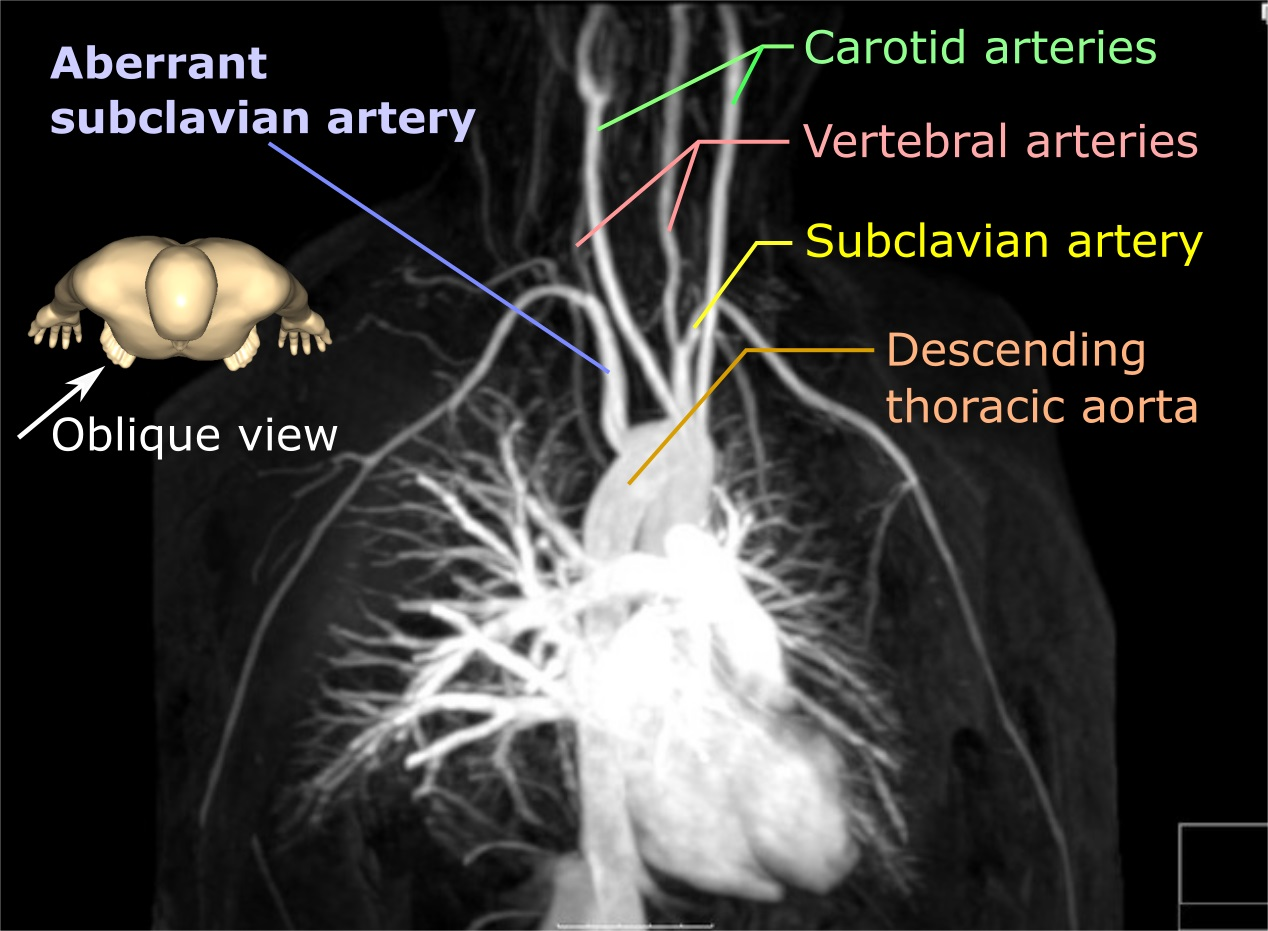
- Aberrant subclavian artery on MR angiography.
- Specialty: Medical genetics

Aberrant subclavian artery, or aberrant subclavian artery syndrome, is a rare anatomical variant of the origin of the right or left subclavian artery. This abnormality is the most common congenital vascular anomaly of the aortic arch, occurring in approximately 1% of individuals.

== Presentation ==
This condition is usually asymptomatic. The aberrant artery usually arises just distal to the left subclavian artery and crosses in the posterior part of the mediastinum on its way to the right upper extremity. In 80% of individuals it crosses behind the esophagus. Such course of this aberrant vessel may cause a vascular ring around the trachea and esophagus. Dysphagia due to an aberrant right subclavian artery is termed dysphagia lusoria, although this is a rare complication. In addition to dysphagia, aberrant right subclavian artery may cause stridor, dyspnoea, chest pain, or fever. An aberrant right subclavian artery may compress the recurrent laryngeal nerve causing a palsy of that nerve, which is termed Ortner's syndrome.

The aberrant right subclavian artery frequently arises from a dilated segment of the proximal descending aorta, the so-called Diverticulum of Kommerell (which was named for the German radiologist Burkhard Friedrich Kommerell (1901–1990), who discovered it in 1936). It is alternatively known as a lusorian artery.

== Pathophysiology ==
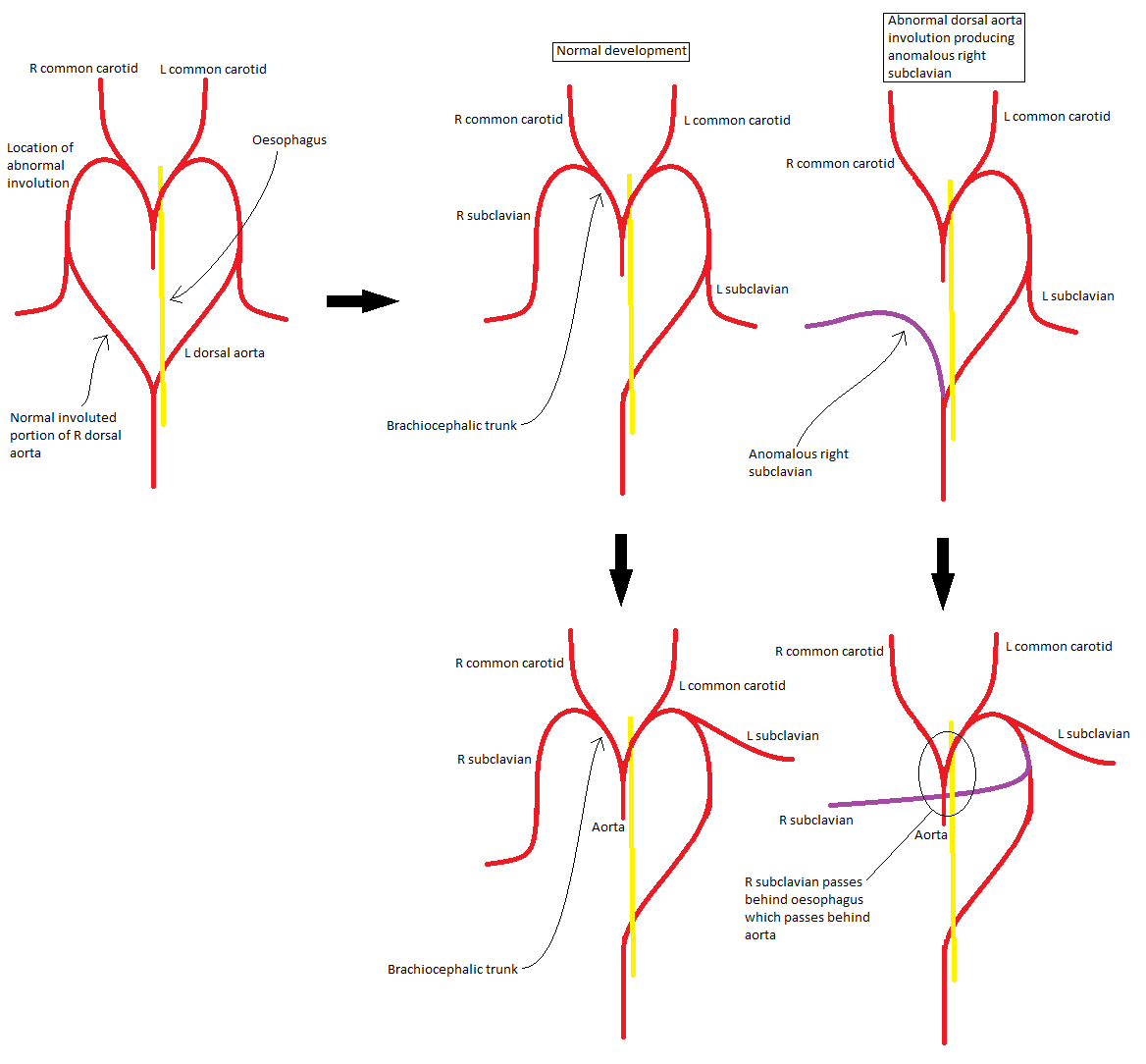
The embryological basis of the retroesophageal aberrant right subclavian artery

In the normal embryological development of the aortic arches, the right dorsal aorta regresses caudal to the origin of the 7th intersegmental artery which gives rise to the right subclavian artery. In formation of an aberrant right subclavian artery, the regression occurs instead between the 7th intersegmental artery and the right common carotid so that the right subclavian artery is then connected to the left dorsal aorta via the part of the right dorsal aorta which normally regresses. During growth, the origin of the right subclavian artery migrates until it is just distal to that of the left subclavian.

== Diagnosis ==
An aberrant subclavian artery (ASA) is commonly diagnosed through imaging studies that visualize the structure and origin of blood vessels. Is it often diagnosed incidentally. Here are the primary diagnostic tools used:

Echocardiography: Especially in infants, an echocardiogram may initially detect abnormal vessel placement. Though this method can provide clues, it may not always offer detailed images of the aorta and subclavian arteries.

Computed Tomography (CT) Angiography: CT scans with contrast provide high-resolution, 3D images of blood vessels, allowing clear visualization of the ASA’s location and course relative to the trachea and esophagus.

Magnetic Resonance Imaging (MRI): MRI or MR angiography can similarly detail the vascular anatomy and is often used in children to reduce radiation exposure.

Barium Swallow Study: If there are symptoms like dysphagia, this test can reveal if the esophagus is compressed by the aberrant artery, suggesting the presence of a vascular ring.

Each of these techniques provides unique insights into the vascular structure, helping determine the presence, orientation, and potential impact of an aberrant subclavian artery.

== Treatment ==
Surgery is occasionally used to treat the condition.

== Images ==
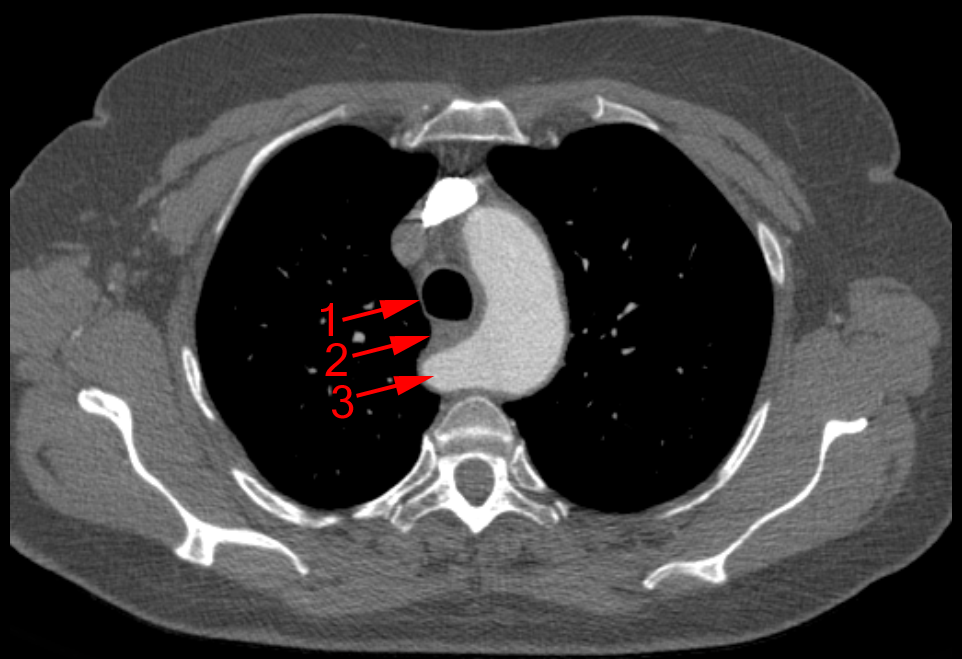
Aberrant subclavian artery at axial CT-scan. (1) trachea, (2) esophagus, (3) aberrant subclavian artery.

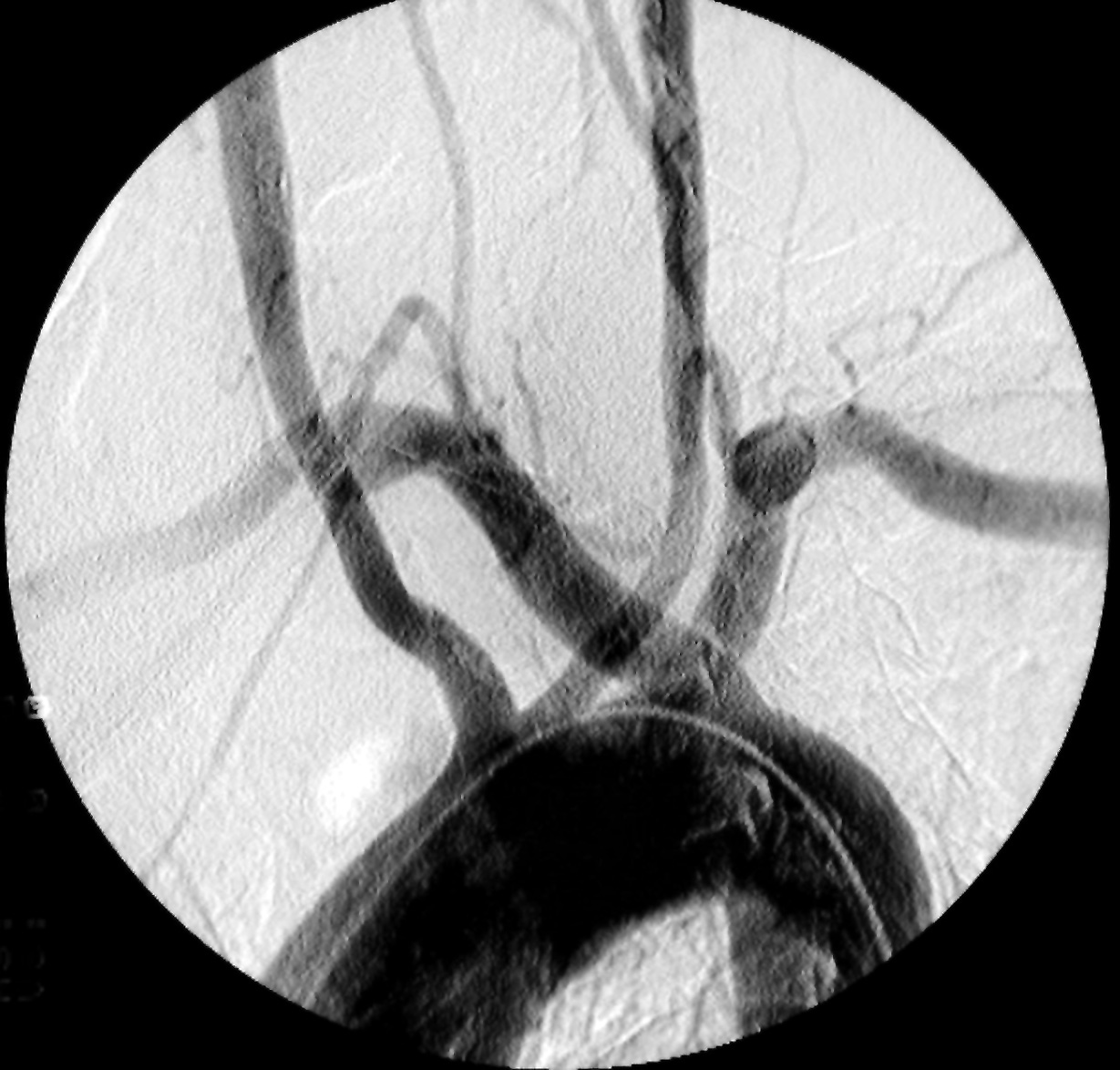
Aberrant right subclavian artery at angiography.

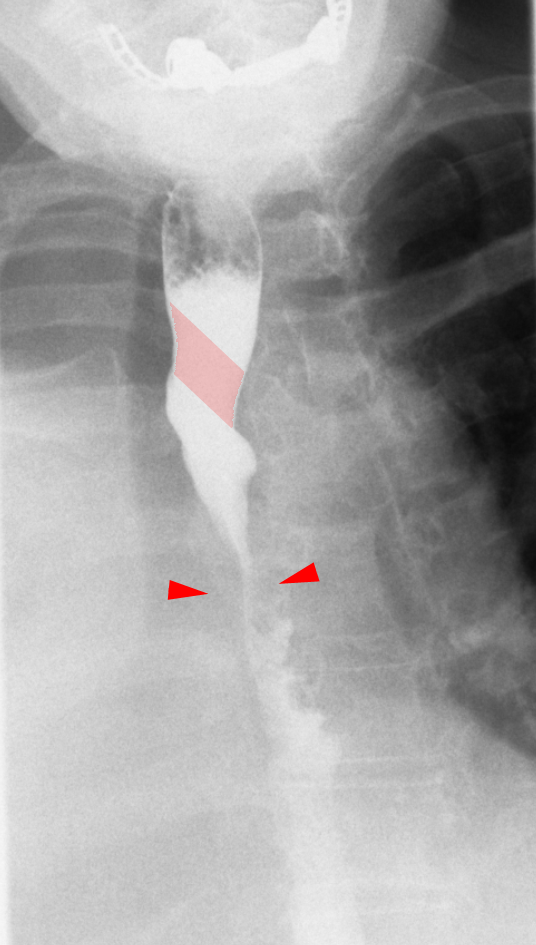
Tape-like impression of the esophagus caused by aberrant subclavian artery. Below (arrows) narrowing of the esophagus by a tumor that is causing the swallowing problems.

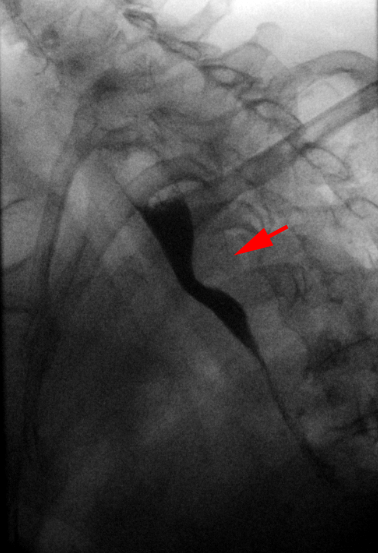
Aberrant subclavian artery seen at swallowing study: impression of the esophagus from behind.

== See also ==
- Dysphagia lusoria
