= Suprascapular vein =

Vein of the neck

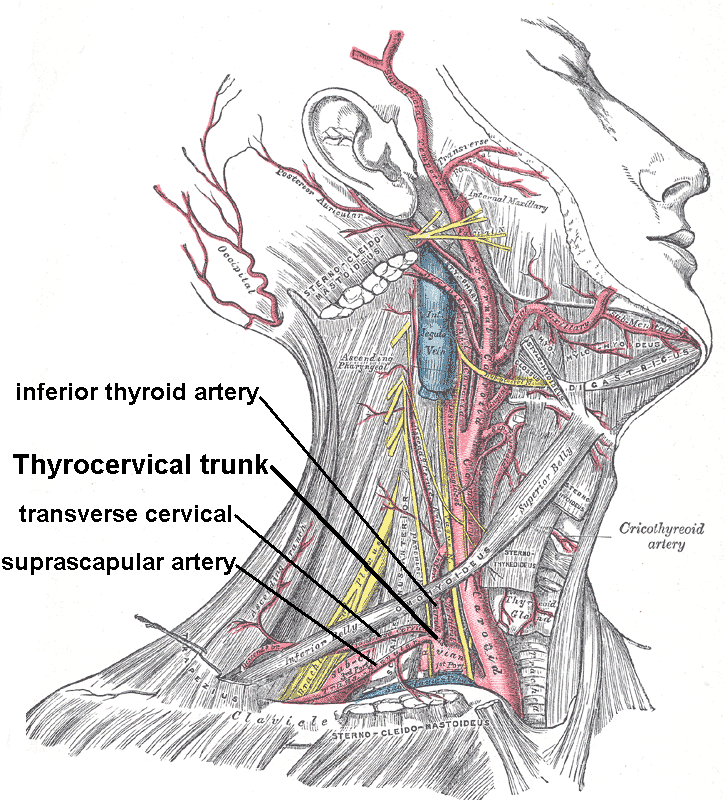
- Thyrocervical trunk with branches, including suprascapular artery (image is of artery, not vein. However, vein is in similar location)

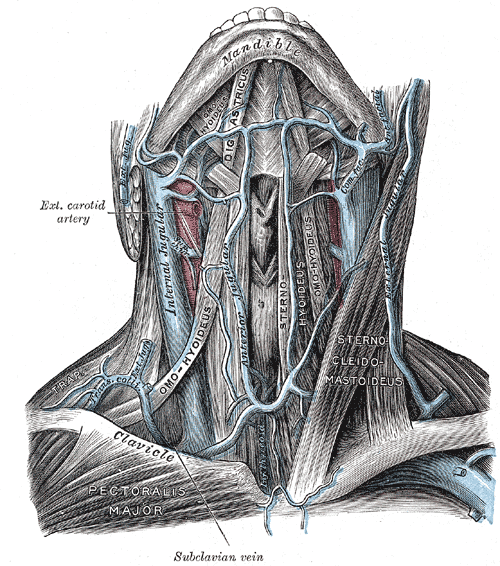
- The veins of the neck, viewed from in front (suprascapular vein not labeled, but region is visible)

Details
- Drains to: External jugular vein
- Artery: Suprascapular artery

Identifiers
- Latin: vena suprascapularis
- TA98: A12.3.05.049
- TA2: 4961
- FMA: 14319

The suprascapular vein is a vein running above the scapula. It drains into the external jugular vein. It drains the posterior region around the scapula.

== Structure ==
The suprascapular vein runs above the scapula. It runs above the anterior coracospinal ligament. It lies close to the suprascapular artery. It drains into the external jugular vein.

=== Variation ===
The course of the suprascapular vein is not very variable. In nearly 20% of people, there may be 2 suprascapular veins lying next to each other. In a very small minority, there may be three.

== Function ==
The suprascapular vein drains the posterior region around the scapula.
