= Dorsal scapular vein =

Blood vessel

Details
- Drains to: Subclavian vein
- Artery: Dorsal scapular artery

Identifiers
- Latin: vena scapularis dorsalis
- TA98: A12.3.08.004
- TA2: 4955
- FMA: 22931

The dorsal scapular vein is a vein which accompanies the dorsal scapular artery. It usually drains to the subclavian vein, but can also drain to the external jugular vein.
