= Xiphisternal joint =

Body part

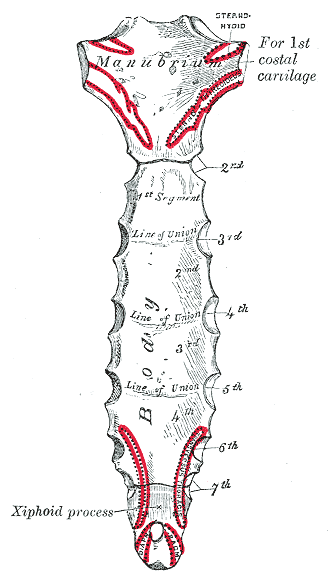
- Posterior surface of sternum.

Details

Identifiers
- Latin: symphysis xiphosternalis
- TA98: A03.3.02.005
- TA2: 1716
- FMA: 7503

The xiphisternal joint (or xiphisternal symphysis) is a location near the bottom of the sternum, where the body of the sternum and the xiphoid process meet. It is structurally classified as a synchondrosis, and functionally classified as a synarthrosis. The joint usually ossifies by the fourth decade of life, forming a synostosis.

It is in line with the T9 vertebra.
