= Intertransverse ligament =

Ligament of the spine

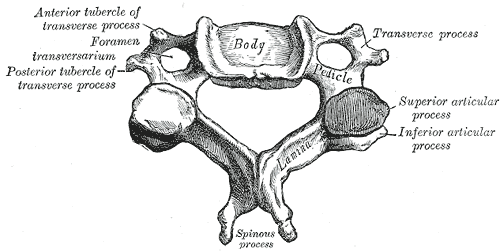
- A cervical vertebra (transverse processes labeled at upper right)

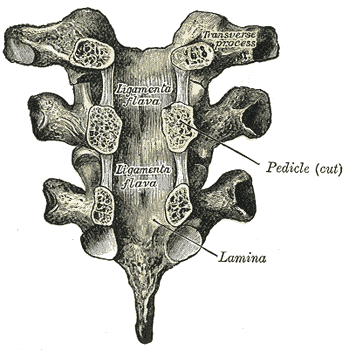
- Vertebral arches of three thoracic vertebrae viewed from the front

Details
- From: Transverse processes
- To: Transverse processes

Identifiers
- Latin: ligamenta intertransversaria
- TA98: A03.2.01.004
- TA2: 1676
- FMA: 13426

The intertransverse ligaments are weak, sheet-like ligaments interconnecting adjacent transverse processes in the thoracic spine, and adjacent accessory processes in the lumbar spine. They act to limit lateral flexion and rotation of the spine.

== Structure ==
In the cervical region, they consist of a few irregular fibers that are largely replaced by the intertransversarii. In the thoracic region, they are rounded cords intimately connected with the deep muscles of the back. In the lumbar, region they are thin and membranous.

The intertransverse ligaments often blend with the intertransverse muscles.
