= Thyrocervical trunk =

Artery of the neck

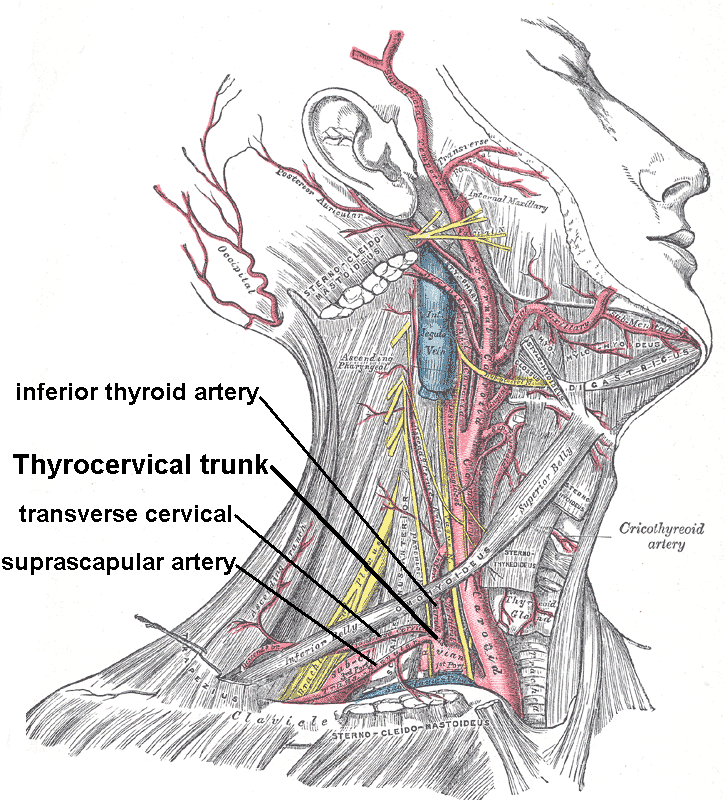
- Superficial dissection of the right side of the neck, showing the carotid and subclavian arteries.

Details
- Source: Subclavian artery
- Branches: Inferior thyroid artery Suprascapular artery Transverse cervical artery

Identifiers
- Latin: truncus thyrocervicalis
- TA98: A12.2.08.042
- TA2: 4590
- FMA: 3990

The thyrocervical trunks are very small arteries of the neck arising from the subclavian arteries, lateral to the vertebral arteries. They divide into branches: the inferior thyroid artery, suprascapular artery, and the transverse cervical artery.

The thyrocervical trunks supply the thyroid gland and some scapular muscles.

== Structure ==
The thyrocervical trunk is a branch of the subclavian artery. It arises from the first portion of this vessel, between the origin of the subclavian artery and the inner border of the anterior scalene muscle. It is located distally to the vertebral artery and proximally to the costocervical trunk. It is short and wide artery.

=== Branches ===
The thyrocervical trunk soon divides into branches: the inferior thyroid artery, the suprascapular artery, and the transverse cervical artery.

The transverse cervical artery is present in about 2/3 of cases. In a third of cases the superficial cervical artery and the dorsal scapular artery arise as the transverse cervical artery.

The suprascapular artery and transverse cervical artery both head laterally and cross in front of (anterior to) the anterior scalene muscle and the phrenic nerve. The inferior thyroid artery runs superiorly from the thyrocervical trunk to the inferior portion of the thyroid gland. There is significant variation in the origin of these vessels.
