= Intersegmental artery =

Set of blood vessels in embryonic development

The intersegmental arteries are a set of approximately 30 arteries arising from the embryonic dorsal aorta, with each artery providing blood supply to one somite and its derivatives.

== Cervical intersegmental arteries ==
The cervical intersegmental arteries merge into the vertebral artery with the exception of the 7th (or possibly the 6th) cervical intersegmental artery, which becomes the subclavian artery. The confusion arises because the vertebral artery drains into the subclavian artery following the disappearance of the dorsal aortae in part of the cervical region.

== Thoracic intersegmental arteries ==
The thoracic intersegmental arteries all develop into the intercostal arteries.

== Lumbar intersegmental arteries ==
The lumbar intersegmental arteries develop into the lumbar arteries, with the exception of the 5th (last) lumbar intersegmental artery, which becomes the common iliac arteries.

== Sacral intersegmental arteries ==
These arteries merge into the lateral sacral artery.
