= Subclavian artery =

Major arteries of the upper thorax, below the clavicle

- Schematic of the proximal aorta and its branches. The left subclavian artery is the fifth branch of the aorta and the third branch from the arch of the aorta. The right subclavian artery arises from the brachiocephalic artery and its branches. (Right subclavian is at upper left, and left subclavian is at upper right.)

Details
- Source: Aortic arch (left); Brachiocephalic (right)
- Branches: Vertebral artery internal thoracic artery thyrocervical trunk costocervical trunk dorsal scapular artery (mostly)
- Vein: Subclavian vein

Identifiers
- Latin: arteria subclavia
- MeSH: D013348
- TA98: A12.2.08.001
- TA2: 4537
- FMA: 3951

In human anatomy, the subclavian arteries are paired major arteries of the upper thorax, below the clavicle. They receive blood from the aortic arch. The left subclavian artery supplies blood to the left arm and the right subclavian artery supplies blood to the right arm, with some branches supplying the head and thorax. On the left side of the body, the subclavian comes directly off the aortic arch, while on the right side it arises from the relatively short brachiocephalic artery when it bifurcates into the subclavian and the right common carotid artery.

The usual branches of the subclavian on both sides of the body are the vertebral artery, the internal thoracic artery, the thyrocervical trunk, the costocervical trunk and the dorsal scapular artery, which may branch off the transverse cervical artery, which is a branch of the thyrocervical trunk. The subclavian becomes the axillary artery at the lateral border of the first rib.

== Structure ==
From its origin, the subclavian artery travels laterally, passing between anterior and middle scalene muscles, with the anterior scalene on its anterior side and the middle scalene on its posterior. This is in contrast to the subclavian vein, which travels anterior to the anterior scalene. As the subclavian artery crosses the lateral border of the first rib, it becomes the axillary artery.

On the right side, the subclavian artery arises from the brachiocephalic (innominate) artery behind the right sternoclavicular articulation; on the left side it springs from the arch of the aorta. The two vessels, therefore, in the first part of their course, differ in length, direction, and relation with neighboring structures. The left subclavian artery is around 9 cm long in adults, while the right subclavian artery is around 6 cm long. Both have a width of 9-12 mm.

=== Parts ===
In order to facilitate the description, each subclavian artery is divided into three parts:

- The first part, also known as the prescalene part, extends from the origin of the vessel to the medial border of the scalenus anterior muscle.
- The second part, also known as the scalene part, lies behind the anterior scalene muscle.
- The third part, also known as the postscalene part, extends from the lateral margin of the muscle to the outer border of the first rib, where it becomes the axillary artery.

The first portions of the two vessels require separate descriptions; the second and third parts of the two arteries are practically alike.

==== First part ====
===== Right subclavian artery =====
The first part of the right subclavian artery arises from the brachiocephalic trunk, behind the upper part of the right sternoclavicular articulation. It passes upward and lateralward to the medial margin of the scalenus anterior muscle. It ascends a little above the medial part of the clavicle.

It is covered, in front, by the integument, superficial fascia, the platysma muscle, deep fascia, the clavicular origin of the sternocleidomastoid muscle, the sternohyoid muscle, and the sternothyroid muscle, and another layer of the deep fascia. It is crossed by the internal jugular vein and the vertebral vein, by the vagus nerve and the cardiac branches of the vagus and sympathetic, and by the subclavian loop of the sympathetic trunk which forms a ring around the vessel. The anterior jugular vein is directed laterally in front of the artery, but is separated from it by the sternohyoid muscle and the sternothyroid muscle. Below and behind the artery is the pleura, which separates it from the apex of the lung. Behind the artery is the sympathetic trunk, the longus colli muscle and the first thoracic vertebra (T1). The right recurrent laryngeal nerve winds around the lower and back part of the vessel.

===== Left subclavian artery =====
The first part of the left subclavian artery arises from the aortic arch, behind the left common carotid artery, and at the level of the fourth thoracic vertebra. It ascends in the superior mediastinal cavity to the root of the neck, and then arches lateralward to the medial border of the scalenus anterior muscle.

It is in relation, in front, with the vagus nerve, the cardiac nerves, and the phrenic nerves, which lie parallel with it, the left common carotid artery, left internal jugular and vertebral veins, and the commencement of the left innominate vein. It is covered by the sternothyroid muscle, the sternohyoid muscle, and the sternocleidomastoid muscle. Behind, it is in relation with the esophagus, thoracic duct, left recurrent laryngeal nerve, inferior cervical ganglion of the sympathetic trunk, and the longus colli muscle; higher up, however, the esophagus and thoracic duct lie to its right side; the latter ultimately arching over the vessel to join the angle of union between the subclavian and internal jugular veins. Medial to it are the esophagus, trachea, thoracic duct, and left recurrent laryngeal nerve. Lateral to it are the left pleura and lung.

==== Second part ====
The second portion of the subclavian artery lies behind the scalenus anterior muscle and in front of the scalenus medius muscle. It is very short, and forms the highest part of the arch described by the vessel.

In front, it is covered by the skin, the superficial fascia, the platysma muscle, the deep cervical fascia, the sternocleidomastoid muscle, and the scalenus anterior muscle. On the right side of the neck, the phrenic nerve is separated from the second part of the artery by the scalenus anterior muscle, while on the left side it crosses the first part of the artery close to the medial edge of the muscle. Behind the artery are the pleura and the scalenus medius muscle. Above the artery is the brachial plexus. Below the artery is the pleura. The subclavian vein lies below and anterior to the artery, separated from it by the scalenus anterior muscle.

==== Third part ====
The third portion of the subclavian artery runs downward and lateralward from the lateral margin of the scalenus anterior muscle to the outer border of the first rib, where it becomes the axillary artery. This is the most superficial portion of the vessel, and is contained in the subclavian triangle.

It is covered, in front, by the skin, the superficial fascia, the platysma muscle, the supraclavicular nerves, and the deep cervical fascia. The external jugular vein crosses its medial part and receives the transverse scapular, transverse cervical, and anterior jugular veins, which frequently form a plexus in front of the artery. Behind the veins, the nerve to the Subclavius descends in front of the artery. The terminal part of the artery lies behind the clavicle and the Subclavius and is crossed by the transverse scapular vessels. The subclavian vein is in front of and at a slightly lower level than the artery. Behind, it lies on the lowest trunk of the brachial plexus, which intervenes between it and the scalenus medius muscle. Above and to its lateral side are the upper trunks of the brachial plexus and the omohyoid muscle. Below, it rests on the upper surface of the first rib.

=== Branches ===
The subclavian arteries give off five major arteries each: the vertebral artery, the internal thoracic artery, the thyrocervical trunk, the costocervical trunk, and the dorsal scapular artery.

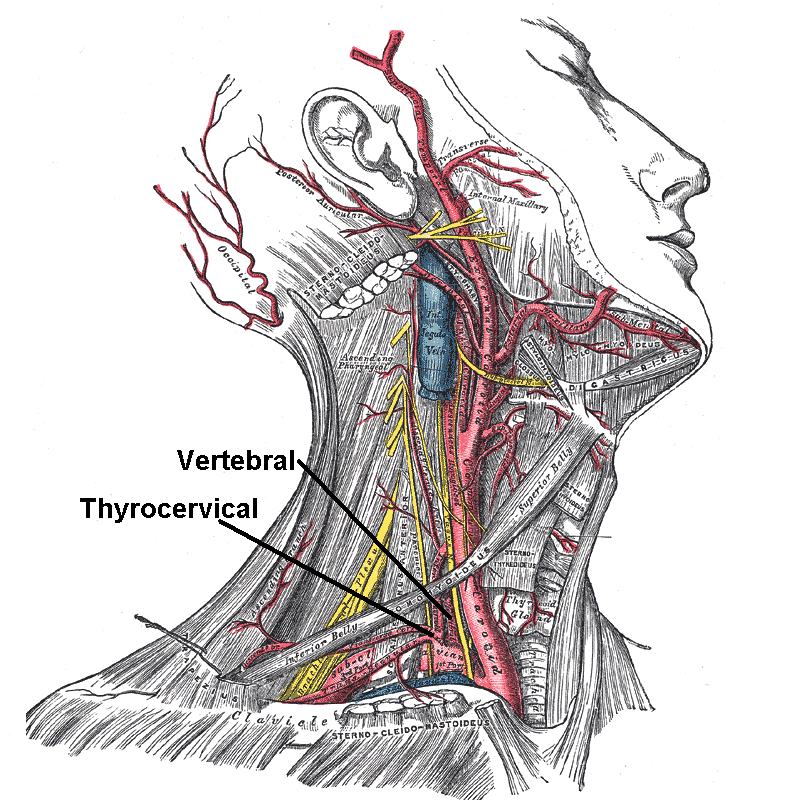
Superficial dissection of the right side of the neck, showing the carotid and subclavian arteries. Branch of vertebral artery and thyrocervical trunk is labeled. Internal thoracic artery branches from same segment, but inferiorily, and is therefore not visible.

Part	Branches	Course
First part From its origin to the medial border of scalenus anterior	Vertebral artery	Runs cranially in the transverse foramina of the cervical vertebrae, joins the vertebral artery on the contralateral side, forming the basilar artery and joins the circle of Willis.
First part From its origin to the medial border of scalenus anterior	Internal thoracic artery	Runs caudally behind the ribs, giving off anterior intercostal branches, perforating vessels to the breast and terminating in the superior epigastric artery and the musculophrenic artery.
First part From its origin to the medial border of scalenus anterior	Thyrocervical trunk	Very short. Divides into inferior thyroid artery, suprascapular artery and transverse cervical artery (also called cervicodorsal trunk).
Second part Lying behind scalenus anterior	Costocervical trunk	Splits into superior intercostal artery and deep cervical artery.
Third part Between the lateral border of scalenus anterior and the outer border of the first rib	Dorsal scapular artery	From either second or third part. Passes backwards to supply levator scapulae and rhomboids.

=== Development ===
Embryologically, the left subclavian simply arises from the left 7th intersegmental artery, while the right subclavian arises, proximal to distal:

1. right 4th aortic arch
2. right dorsal aorta
3. right 7th intersegmental artery

Essentially, the 4th aortic arch and dorsal aorta form the aortic arch on the left, but since the right dorsal aorta regresses distal to the right 7th intersegmental artery, on the right they form the proximal portion of the subclavian artery. Since the left subclavian is then a tributary of the left common carotid, they can be thought of as arising from the brachiocephalic trunk.

=== Variation ===
The subclavian arteries vary in their origin, their course, and the height to which they rise in the neck.

The origin of the right subclavian from the innominate takes place, in some cases, above the sternoclavicular articulation, and occasionally, but less frequently, below that joint. The artery may arise as a separate trunk from the arch of the aorta, and in such cases it may be either the first, second, third, or even the last branch derived from that vessel; in the majority, however, it is the first or last, rarely the second or third. When it is the first branch, it occupies the ordinary position of the innominate artery; when the second or third, it gains its usual position by passing behind the right carotid; and when the last branch, it arises from the left extremity of the arch, and passes obliquely toward the right side, usually behind the trachea, esophagus, and right carotid, sometimes between the esophagus and trachea, to the upper border of the first rib, whence it follows its ordinary course. In very rare instances, this vessel arises from the thoracic aorta, as low down as the fourth thoracic vertebra. Occasionally, it perforates the anterior scalene; more rarely it passes in front of that muscle. Sometimes the subclavian vein passes with the artery behind the Scalenus anterior. The artery may ascend as high as 4 cm. above the clavicle, or any intermediate point between this and the upper border of the bone, the right subclavian usually ascending higher than the left.

The left subclavian is occasionally joined at its origin with the left common carotid artery, forming a left brachiocephalic trunk.

The left subclavian artery is more deeply placed than the right in the first part of its course, and, as a rule, does not reach quite as high a level in the neck. The posterior border of the sternocleidomastoid corresponds pretty closely to the lateral border of the anterior scalene, so that the third portion of the artery, the part most accessible for operation, lies immediately lateral to the posterior border of the sternocleidomastoid.

Some authors describe the subclavian artery as arising from the 7th intersegmental artery.

== Function ==
The subclavian arteries carry most of the blood that supplies the arms. It also supplies some blood to the neck and brain.

== Clinical significance ==
Compression of the subclavian artery can cause thoracic outlet syndrome (TOS).

The subclavian arteries can be vulnerable to aneurysm.

Subclavian steal syndrome occurs when there is occlusion or stenosis of the subclavian artery at a point before the branching of the vertebral artery. This can cause blood to flow the wrong way through the vertebral artery into the distal subclavian artery, allowed by the reduced pressure.

The subclavian arteries are relatively superficial, and can be seen using ultrasound.

Aberrant right subclavian artery is a condition where the right subclavian artery arises on the arch of aorta distal to the left subclavian artery, instead of brachiocephalic trunk. This condition occurs in about 0.4 to 1.8% of the general population. The aberrant right subclavian artery than has to cross behind the oesophagus to reach the right side of the body. Majority of those having the condition are asymptomatic, but some may be presented with difficulty in breathing, difficulty in swallowing, grating noise during breathing, and chest pain. This condition has to be ruled out during procedures relating to oesophagus because injury to this artery during the procedure can cause massive bleeding.

== Additional images ==
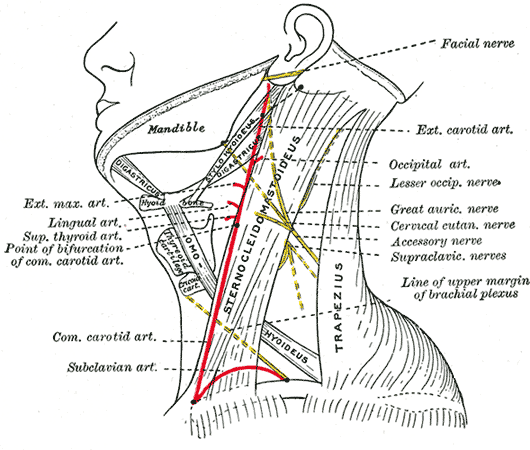
Side of neck, showing chief surface markings.

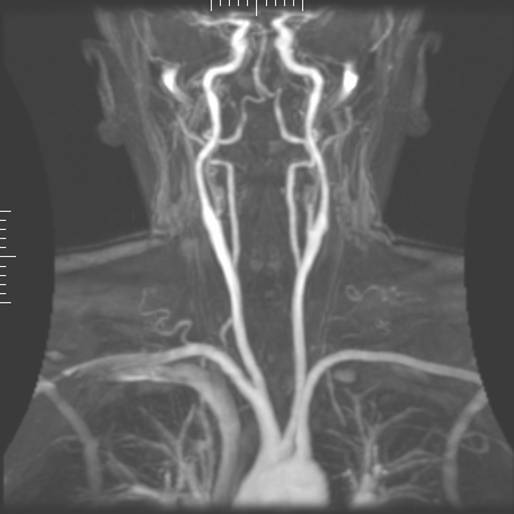
Magnetic Resonance Angiography; view from the front

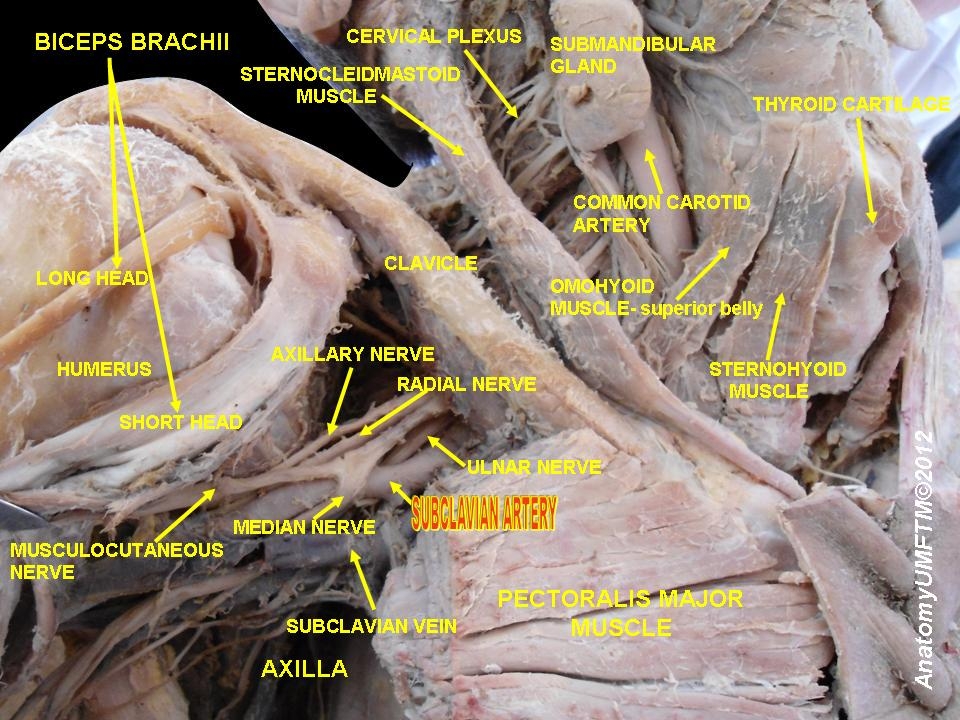
Right subclavian artery

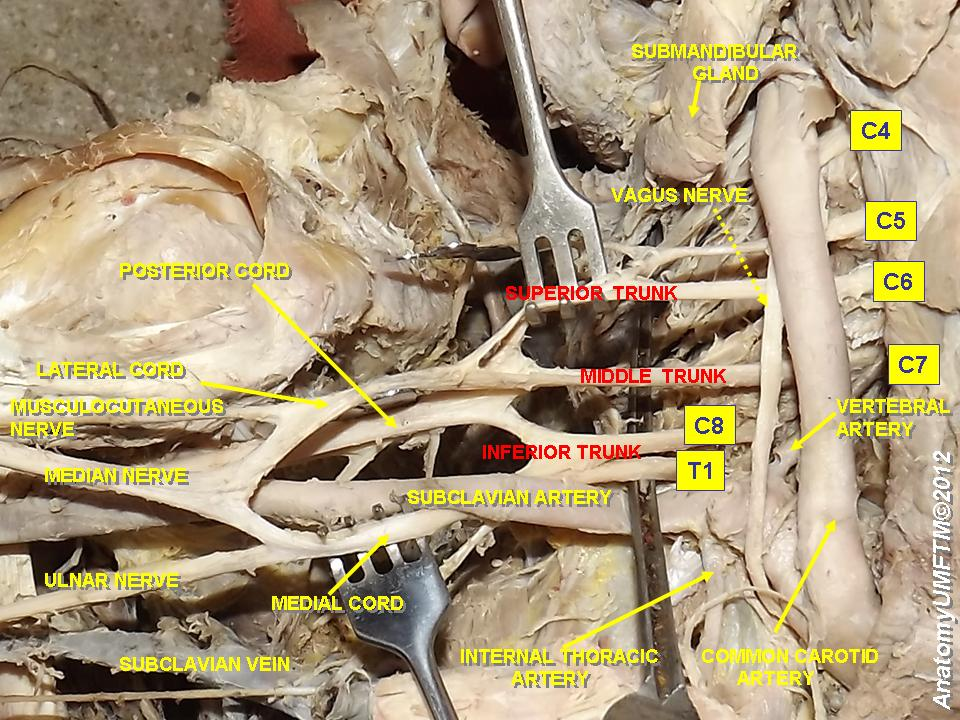
Brachial plexus and subclavian artery

== See also ==
- Aberrant subclavian artery
- Subclavian steal syndrome
- Thoracic outlet syndrome
