= Carpal articulations =

Carpal articulations may refer to the following in the wrist:

- Carpometacarpal joint
- Intercarpal joints
