= Costocervical trunk =

Upper back artery

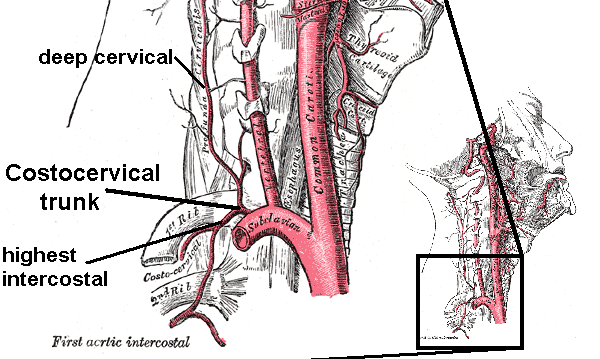
- Neck. Right side.

Details
- Source: Subclavian artery
- Branches: Deep cervical artery and superior intercostal artery

Identifiers
- Latin: truncus costocervicalis
- TA98: A12.2.08.059
- TA2: 4607
- FMA: 10636

The costocervical trunk arises from the superior and posterior part of the second part of subclavian artery, behind the scalenus anterior on the right side, and medial to that muscle on the left side.

Passing backward, it splits into the deep cervical artery and the supreme intercostal artery (highest intercostal artery), which descends behind the pleura in front of the necks of the first and second ribs, and anastomoses with the first aortic intercostal (3rd posterior intercostal artery).

As it crosses the neck of the first rib it lies medial to the anterior division of the first thoracic nerve, and lateral to the first thoracic ganglion of the sympathetic trunk.

In the first intercostal space, it gives off a branch which is distributed in a manner similar to the distribution of the aortic intercostals.

The branch for the second intercostal space usually joins with one from the highest aortic intercostal artery.

This branch is not constant, but is more commonly found on the right side; when absent, its place is supplied by an intercostal branch from the aorta.

Each intercostal gives off a posterior branch which goes to the posterior vertebral muscles, and sends a small spinal branch through the corresponding intervertebral foramen to the medulla spinalis and its membranes.

== Branches ==
- Deep cervical artery
- supreme intercostal artery
