= Deep cervical artery =

Artery of the neck

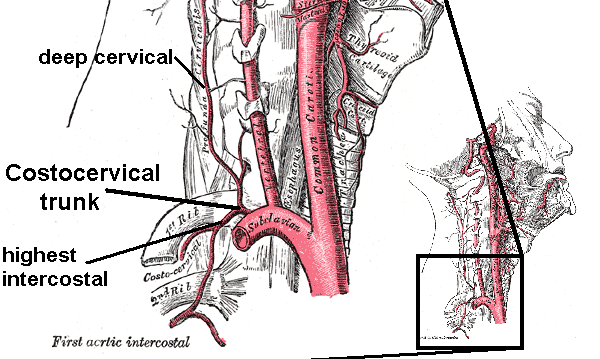
- Costocervical trunk with branches. Right side.

Details
- Source: Costocervical trunk
- Vein: Deep cervical vein

Identifiers
- Latin: arteria cervicalis profunda
- TA98: A12.2.08.060
- TA2: 4608
- FMA: 10659

The deep cervical artery (profunda cervicalis) is an artery of the neck.

== Course ==
It arises, in most cases, from the costocervical trunk, and is analogous to the posterior branch of an aortic intercostal artery: occasionally it is a separate branch from the subclavian artery.

Passing backward, above the eighth cervical nerve and between the transverse process of the seventh cervical vertebra and the neck of the first rib, it runs up the back of the neck, between the semispinalis capitis and semispinalis cervicis, as high as the axis vertebra, supplying these and adjacent muscles, and anastomosing with the deep division of the descending branch of the occipital, and with branches of the vertebral.

It gives off a spinal twig which enters the canal through the intervertebral foramen between the seventh cervical and first thoracic vertebrae.
