= Suprascapular artery =

Artery of the neck

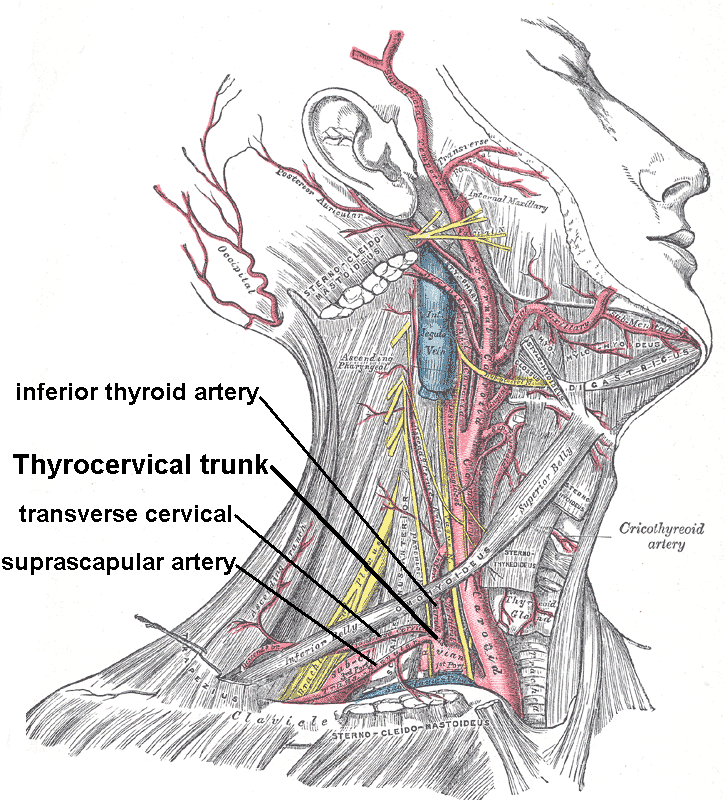
- Thyrocervical trunk with branches, including suprascapular artery.

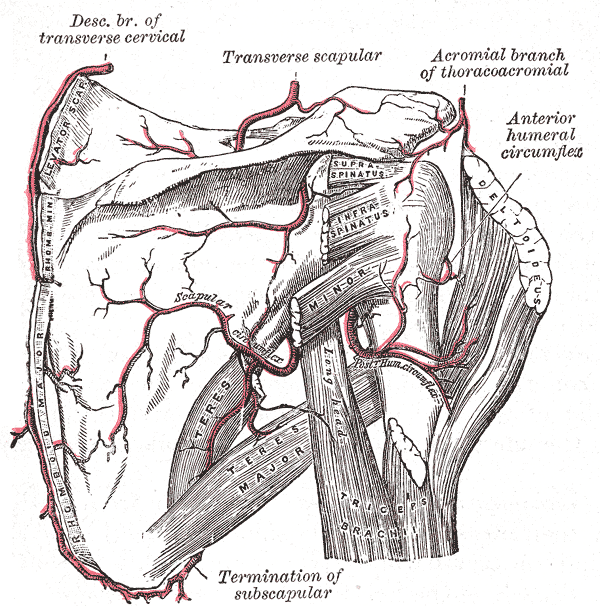
- The scapular and circumflex arteries. (Transverse scapular visible at top.)

Details
- Source: Thyrocervical trunk
- Vein: Suprascapular vein
- Supplies: Supraspinatus muscle, infraspinatus muscle,(sternocleidomastoid), (subclavius)

Identifiers
- Latin: arteria suprascapularis, arteria transversa scapulae
- TA98: A12.2.08.051
- TA2: 4599
- FMA: 10663

The suprascapular artery is a branch of the thyrocervical trunk on the neck.

== Structure ==
At first, it passes downward and laterally across the scalenus anterior and phrenic nerve, being covered by the sternocleidomastoid muscle; it then crosses the subclavian artery and the brachial plexus, running behind and parallel with the clavicle and subclavius muscle and beneath the inferior belly of the omohyoid to the superior border of the scapula. It passes over the superior transverse scapular ligament in most of the cases while below it through the suprascapular notch in some cases.

The artery then enters the supraspinous fossa of the scapula. It travels close to the bone, running through the suprascapular canal underneath the supraspinatus muscle, to which it supplies branches.

It then descends behind the neck of the scapula, through the great scapular notch and under cover of the inferior transverse ligament, to reach the infraspinatous fossa, where it supplies infraspinatus and anastomoses with the scapular circumflex artery and the descending branch (aka dorsal scapular artery) of the transverse cervical artery.

== Function ==
Besides distributing branches to the sternocleidomastoid (which, however, mainly is supplied by the occipital artery and the superior thyroid artery), subclavius (which mainly is supplied by the thoracoacromial artery), and neighboring muscles, it gives off a suprasternal branch, which crosses over the sternal end of the clavicle to the skin of the upper part of the chest; and an acromial branch, which pierces the trapezius and supplies the skin over the acromion, anastomosing with the thoracoacromial artery. Just after supplying the subclavius muscle, it anastomoses with the thoracoacromial artery in supplying skin areas.

As the artery passes over the superior transverse scapular ligament, it sends a branch into the subscapular fossa, where it ramifies beneath the subscapularis, and anastomoses with the subscapular artery and with the dorsal scapular artery.

It also sends articular branches to the acromioclavicular joint and the shoulder joint, and a nutrient artery to the clavicle.
