= Scalene tubercle =

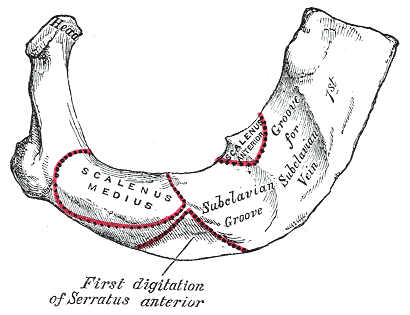
- First rib.

Details

Identifiers
- Latin: tuberculum musculi scaleni anterioris
- TA98: A02.3.02.015
- TA2: 1108
- FMA: 76639

The scalene tubercle is a small projection that runs along the medial border of the first rib between two grooves, which travel anteriorly for the subclavian artery and posteriorly for the subclavian vein. It projects outward medially, and is the site of insertion for scalenus anterior.

== See also ==
- Scalene muscle
- first rib
