= Inferior thyroid artery =

Artery of the neck

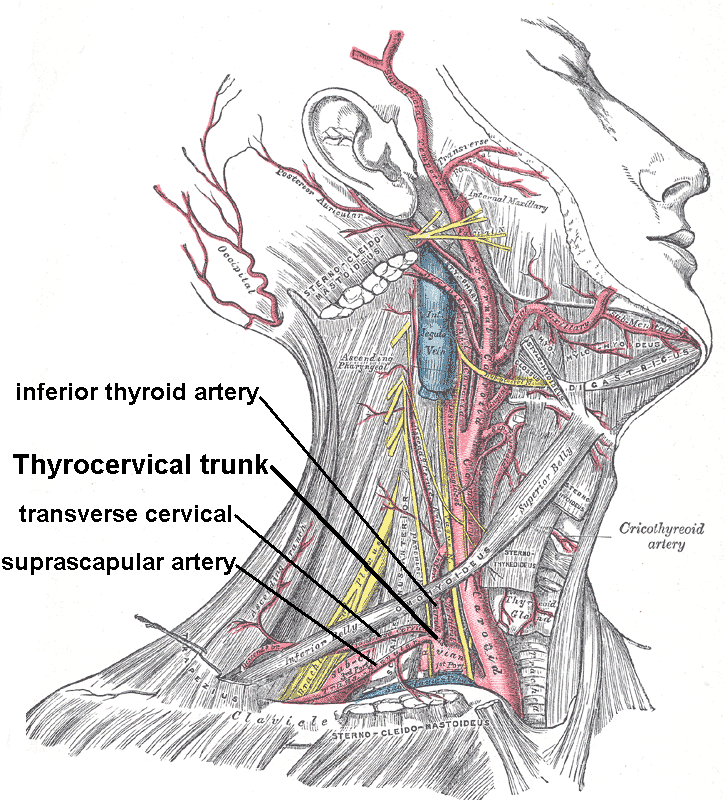
- Thyrocervical trunk and its branches, including inferior thyroid artery. Superficial dissection of the right side of the neck.

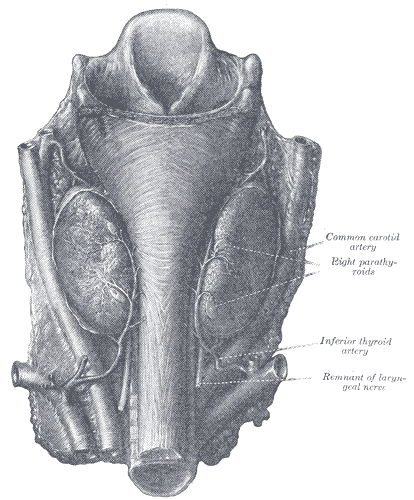
- Human parathyroid glands

Details
- Source: Thyrocervical trunk
- Vein: Inferior thyroid veins
- Supplies: Thyroid gland

Identifiers
- Latin: arteria thyreoidea inferior
- TA98: A12.2.08.043
- TA2: 4591
- FMA: 10662

The inferior thyroid artery is an artery in the neck. It arises from the thyrocervical trunk and passes upward, in front of the vertebral artery and longus colli muscle. It then turns medially behind the carotid sheath and its contents, and also behind the sympathetic trunk, the middle cervical ganglion resting upon the vessel.

Reaching the lower border of the thyroid gland it divides into two branches, which supply the postero-inferior parts of the gland, and anastomose with the superior thyroid artery, and with the corresponding artery of the opposite side.

== Structure ==
The branches of the inferior thyroid artery are the inferior laryngeal, the oesophageal, the tracheal, the ascending cervical and the pharyngeal arteries.

=== Branches ===
Inferior laryngeal artery

The inferior laryngeal artery - accompanied by the recurrent laryngeal nerve - passes superior-ward upon the trachea deep to the inferior pharyngeal constrictor muscle to reach the posterior surface of the larynx. At the inferior border of the inferior pharyngeal constrictor muscle, the artery enters the larynx.

The artery supplies the muscles and mucosa of the larynx.

It forms anastomoses with its contralateral partner, and the superior laryngeal branch of the superior thyroid artery.

Tracheal branches

The tracheal branches are distributed on the trachea, and anastomose inferiorly with the bronchial arteries.

Esophageal branches

The esophageal branches supply the esophagus, and anastomose with the esophageal branches of the thoracic aorta.

Ascending cervical artery

The ascending cervical artery is a small branch which arises from the inferior thyroid artery as it turns medial-ward posterior to the carotid sheath.

The artery ascends upon the anterior tubercles of the transverse processes of the cervical vertebrae between the anterior scalene muscle and longus capitis muscle.

The ascending cervical artery gives twigs to the neck muscles and these anastomose with branches of the vertebral arteries. One or two spinal branches are sent into the spinal canal, through the intervertebral foramina to be distributed to the spinal cord and its membranes, and to the bodies of the vertebrae. It then anastomoses with the ascending pharyngeal and occipital arteries.

Pharyngeal branches

The pharyngeal branches are distributed to the inferior portion of the pharynx.

Glandular branches

The glandular branches are supply the inferior and posterior portions of the thyroid gland. They anastomose with the ipsilateral superior thyroid artery, and the contralateral inferior thyroid artery. The ascending branch supplies the parathyroid gland as well.

== Clinical significance ==
The relationship between the recurrent laryngeal nerve and inferior thyroid artery is highly variable. The recurrent laryngeal nerve passes upward generally behind, but occasionally in front of, the inferior thyroid artery. This makes it vulnerable to injury during surgery that involves ligating the inferior thyroid artery, such as excision of the lower pole of the thyroid gland. Also as the parathyroid is mainly supplied by inferior thyroid artery accidental ligation during thyroidectomy can cause hypoparathyroidism.

The injection of dye into the inferior thyroid artery can be used as an alternate method in identification the recurrent laryngeal nerve.

== Additional images ==
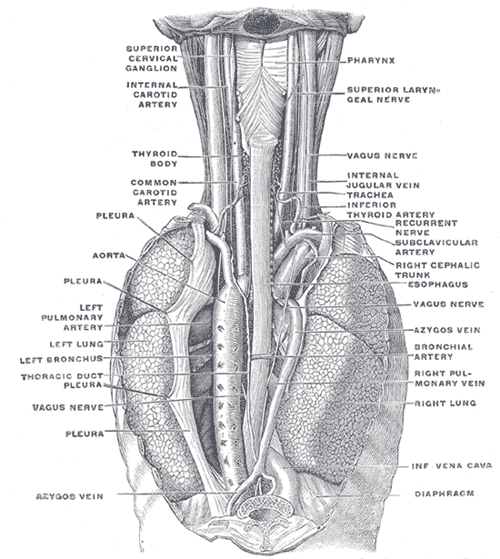
The position and relation of the esophagus in the cervical region and in the posterior mediastinum. Seen from behind.

== See also ==
- Glandular branches of the superior thyroid artery
