= Transverse cervical veins =

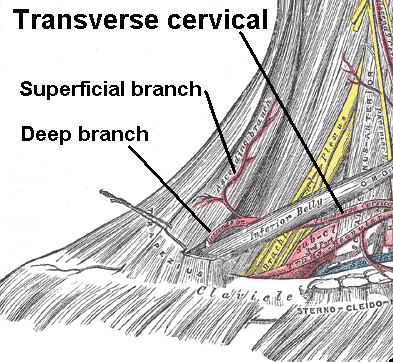
- Superficial and deep branches from the transverse cervical artery (picture is of artery, not vein. However, vein is in similar location.)

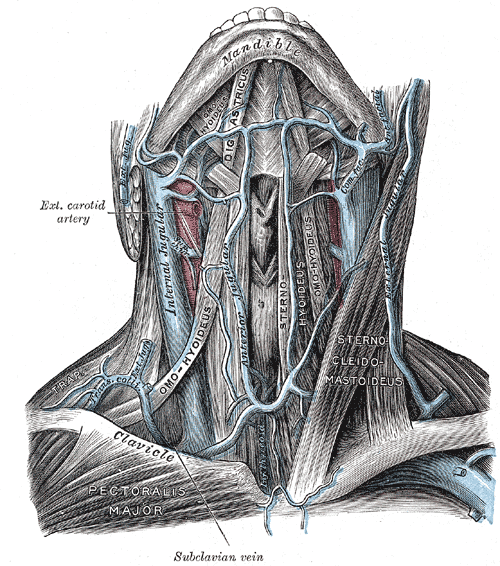
- The veins of the neck, viewed from in front (transverse cervical veins not labeled, but region is visible)

Details
- Drains to: External jugular vein
- Artery: Transverse cervical artery

Identifiers
- Latin: venae transversae cervicis
- TA98: A12.3.05.050
- TA2: 4962
- FMA: 70856

The transverse cervical veins are veins that cross the neck.
