= Deep cervical vein =

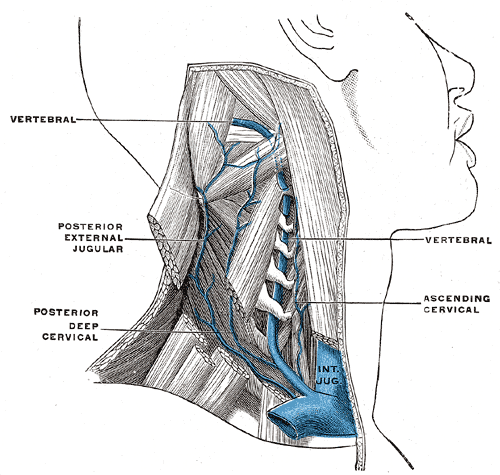
- The vertebral vein

Details
- Drains to: Vertebral vein
- Artery: Deep cervical artery

Identifiers
- Latin: vena cervicalis profunda
- TA98: A12.3.04.017
- TA2: 4785
- FMA: 4746

The deep cervical vein (posterior vertebral vein or posterior deep cervical vein) is the vena comitans of the deep cervical artery. The vein is formed in the suboccipital region by the convergence of communicating branches of the occipital vein, veins draining the suboccipital muscles, and veins from the venous plexuses that surround cervical nerves. The vein and corresponding artery then pass in between the semispinalis capitis muscle and the semispinalis colli muscle. The vein passes anterior-ward in between the transverse process of the 7th cervical vertebra and the neck of the first rib to terminate in the vertebral vein.
