= Transverse cervical artery =

Artery of the neck

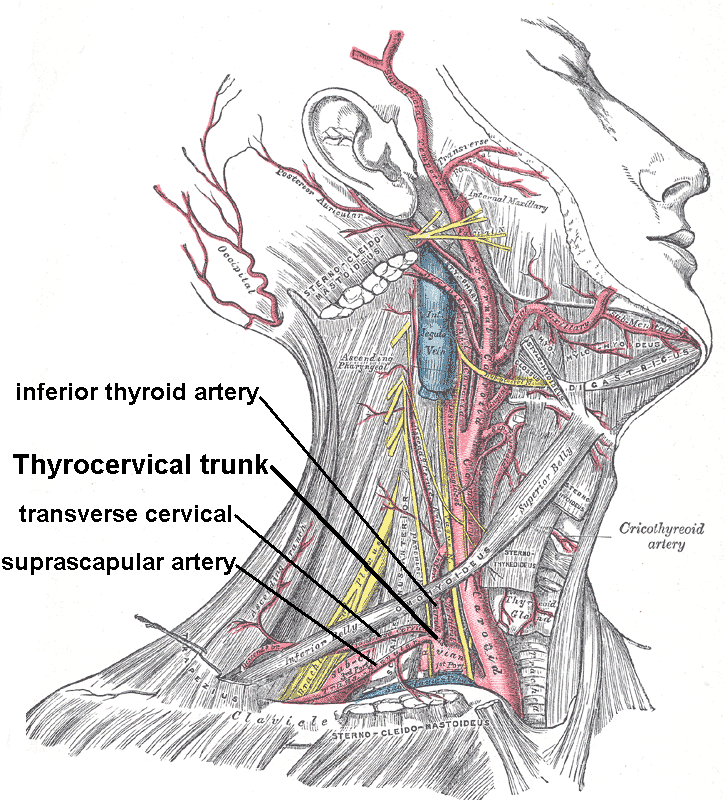
- Superficial dissection of the right side of the neck, showing the carotid and subclavian arteries (transverse cervical artery is labeled, branching from the thyrocervical trunk)

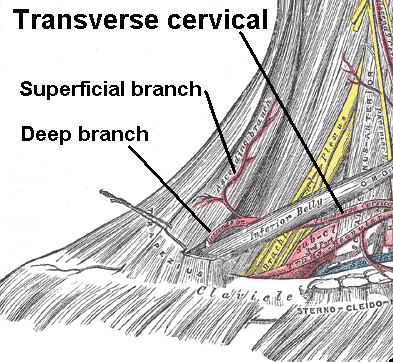
- Superficial and deep branches from the transverse cervical artery

Details
- Source: Thyrocervical trunk
- Branches: Superficial branch dorsal scapular artery (deep branch)
- Vein: Transverse cervical veins
- Supplies: The trapezius and sternocleidomastoid muscles

Identifiers
- Latin: arteria transversa cervicis, arteria transversa colli
- TA98: A12.2.08.053
- TA2: 4601
- FMA: 10664

The transverse cervical artery (transverse artery of neck or transversa colli artery) is an artery in the neck and a branch of the thyrocervical trunk, running at a higher level than the suprascapular artery.

== Structure ==
It passes transversely below the inferior belly of the omohyoid muscle to the anterior margin of the trapezius, beneath which it divides into a superficial and a deep branch.

It crosses in front of the phrenic nerve and the scalene muscles, and in front of or between the divisions of the brachial plexus, and is covered by the platysma and sternocleidomastoid muscles, and crossed by the omohyoid and trapezius.

The transverse cervical artery originates from the thyrocervical trunk, it passes through the posterior triangle of the neck to the anterior border of the levator scapulae muscle, where it divides into deep and superficial branches.

- Superficial branch
  - Ascending branch
  - Descending branch (also known as superficial cervical artery, which supplies the middle and lateral portions of the trapezius)
- Deep branch (also called the dorsal scapular artery). Descending branch in older literature. Most often, however, this artery branches directly from the subclavian artery.

== Function ==
=== Superficial branch ===
Upon entering the trapezius muscle, the superficial branch divides again into an ascending and descending branch. The ascending branch distributes branches to trapezius, and to the neighboring muscles and lymph glands in the neck, and anastomoses with the superficial branch of the descending branch of the occipital artery. The descending branch which is also called as superficial cervical artery, anastomoses with the deep and dorsal scapular artery which in turn links to the subscapular artery. This anastomosis is a ring circulation around the scapula where it continues to the suprascapular artery via the circumflex scapular artery.

=== Deep branch ===
The dorsal scapular artery (or descending scapular artery) is a blood vessel which supplies the levator scapulae, rhomboids, and trapezius.

It most frequently arises from the subclavian artery (the second or third part), but a quarter of the time it arises from the transverse cervical artery. In that case, the artery is also known as the deep branch of the transverse cervical artery, and the junction of those two is called cervicodorsal trunk.

It passes beneath the levator scapulae to the superior angle of the scapula, and then descends under the rhomboid muscles along the vertebral border of the scapula as far as the inferior angle.

It anastomoses with the suprascapular and circumflex scapular arteries.

== Additional images ==
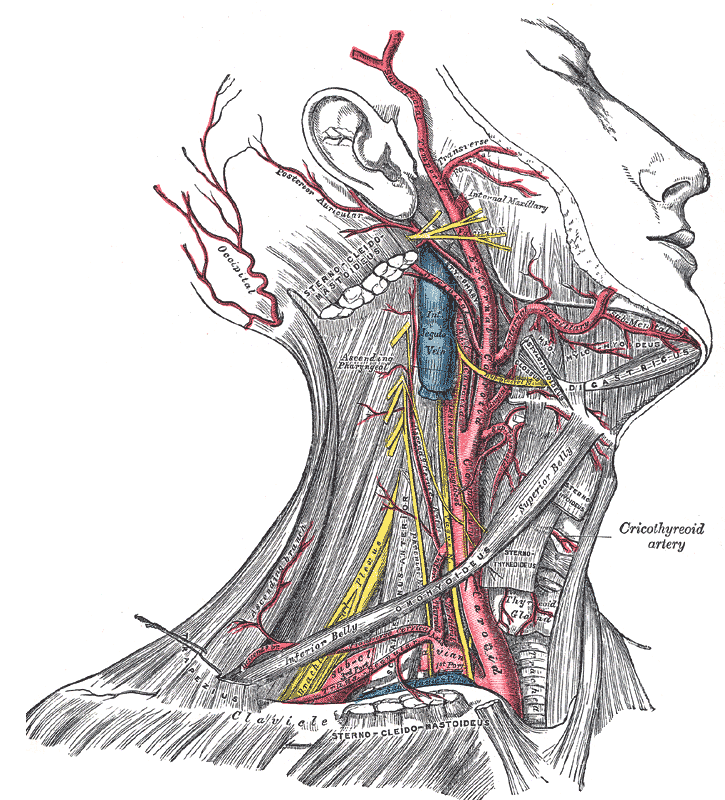
Superficial dissection of the right side of the neck, showing the carotid and subclavian arteries

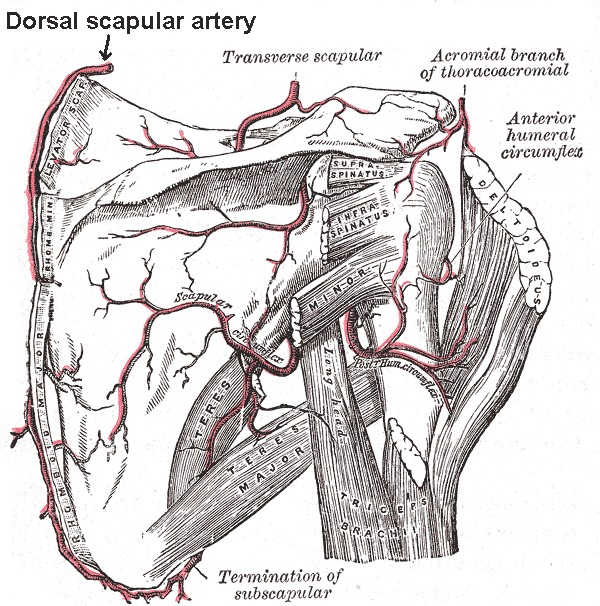
The dorsal scapular artery, sometimes a branch from the transverse cervical artery
