= Scalene muscles =

Muscles on the sides of the neck

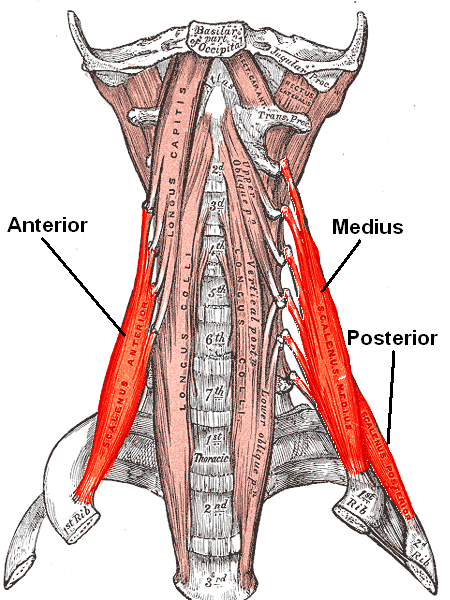
- The anterior vertebral muscles.

Details
- Origin: Cervical vertebrae (CII-CVII)
- Insertion: First and second ribs
- Artery: Ascending cervical artery (branch of Inferior thyroid artery)
- Nerve: Cervical nerves (C3-C8)
- Actions: Elevation of first and second ribs

Identifiers
- Latin: mm. scalenii
- FMA: 64829

The scalene muscles are a group of three muscles on each side of the neck, identified as the anterior, the middle, and the posterior. They are innervated by the third to the eighth cervical spinal nerves (C3-C8).

The anterior and middle scalene muscles lift the first rib and bend the neck to the side they are on. The posterior scalene lifts the second rib and tilts the neck to the same side.

The muscles are named from the Ancient Greek σκαληνός (skalēnós), meaning 'uneven'.

== Structure ==
The scalene muscles are attached at one end to bony protrusions on vertebrae C2 to C7 and at the other end to the first and second ribs.

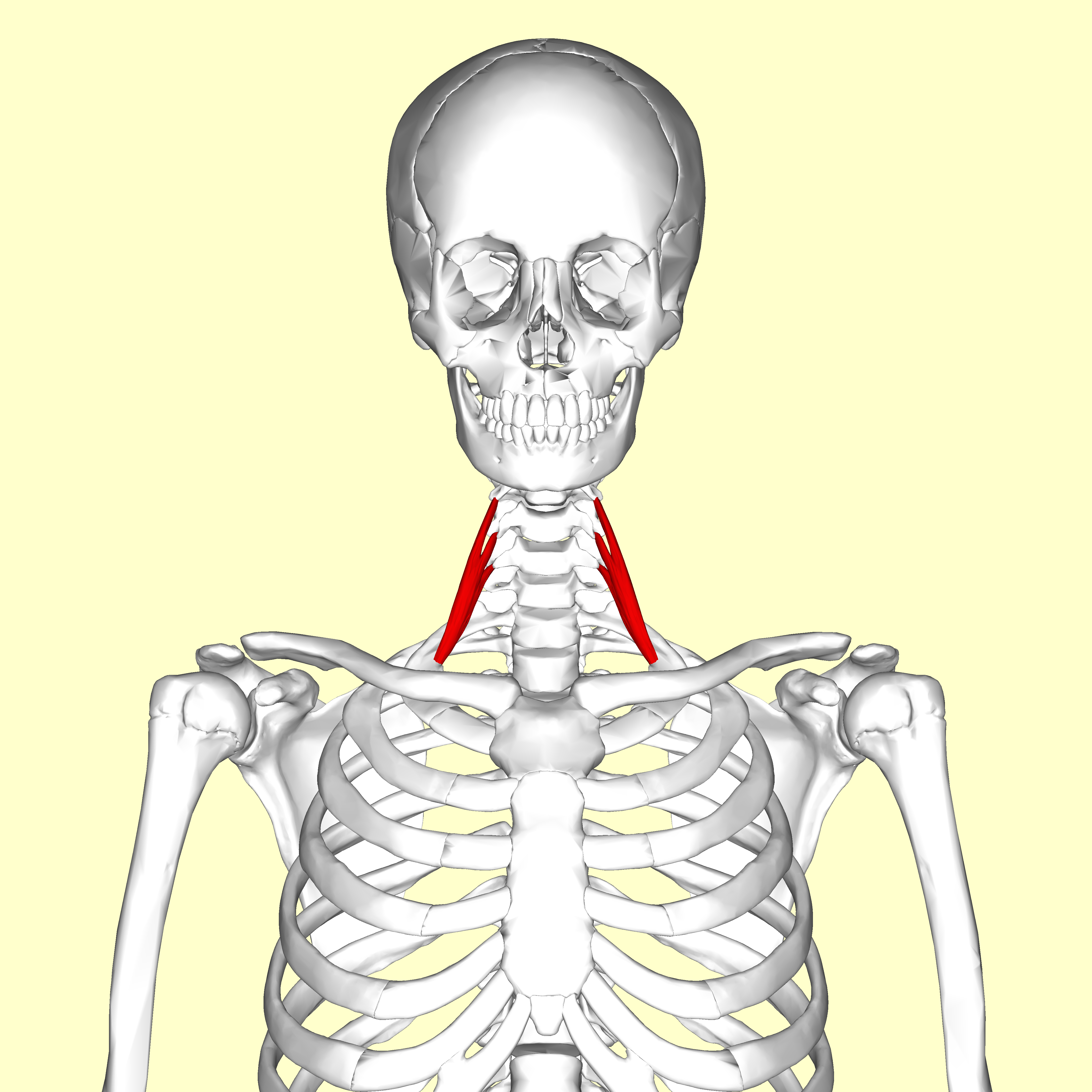
Anterior scalene

=== Anterior scalene ===
The anterior scalene muscle (Latin: scalenus anterior), lies deeply at the side of the neck, behind the sternocleidomastoid muscle. It arises from the anterior tubercles of the transverse processes of the third, fourth, fifth, and sixth cervical vertebrae, and descending, almost vertically, is inserted by a narrow, flat tendon into the scalene tubercle on the inner border of the first rib, and into the ridge on the upper surface of the first rib in front of the subclavian groove. It is supplied by the anterior ramus of cervical nerve 5 and 6.

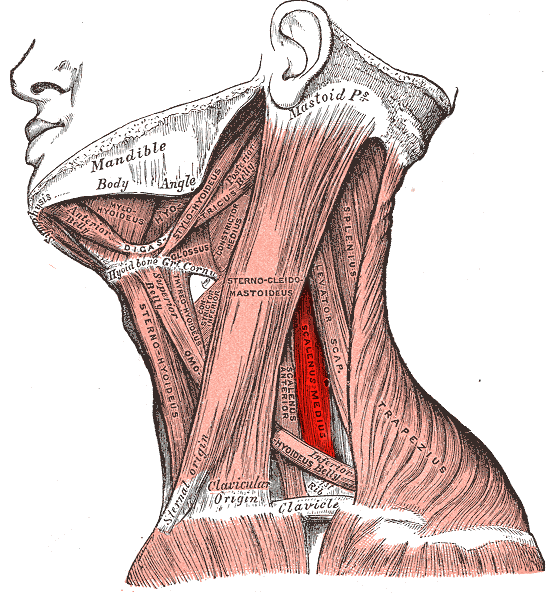
Middle scalene

=== Middle scalene ===
The middle scalene (Latin: scalenus medius), is the largest and longest of the three scalene muscles. The middle scalene arises from the posterior tubercles of the transverse processes of the lower six cervical vertebrae. It descends along the side of the vertebral column to insert by a broad attachment into the upper surface of the first rib, posterior to the subclavian groove. The brachial plexus and the subclavian artery pass anterior to it.

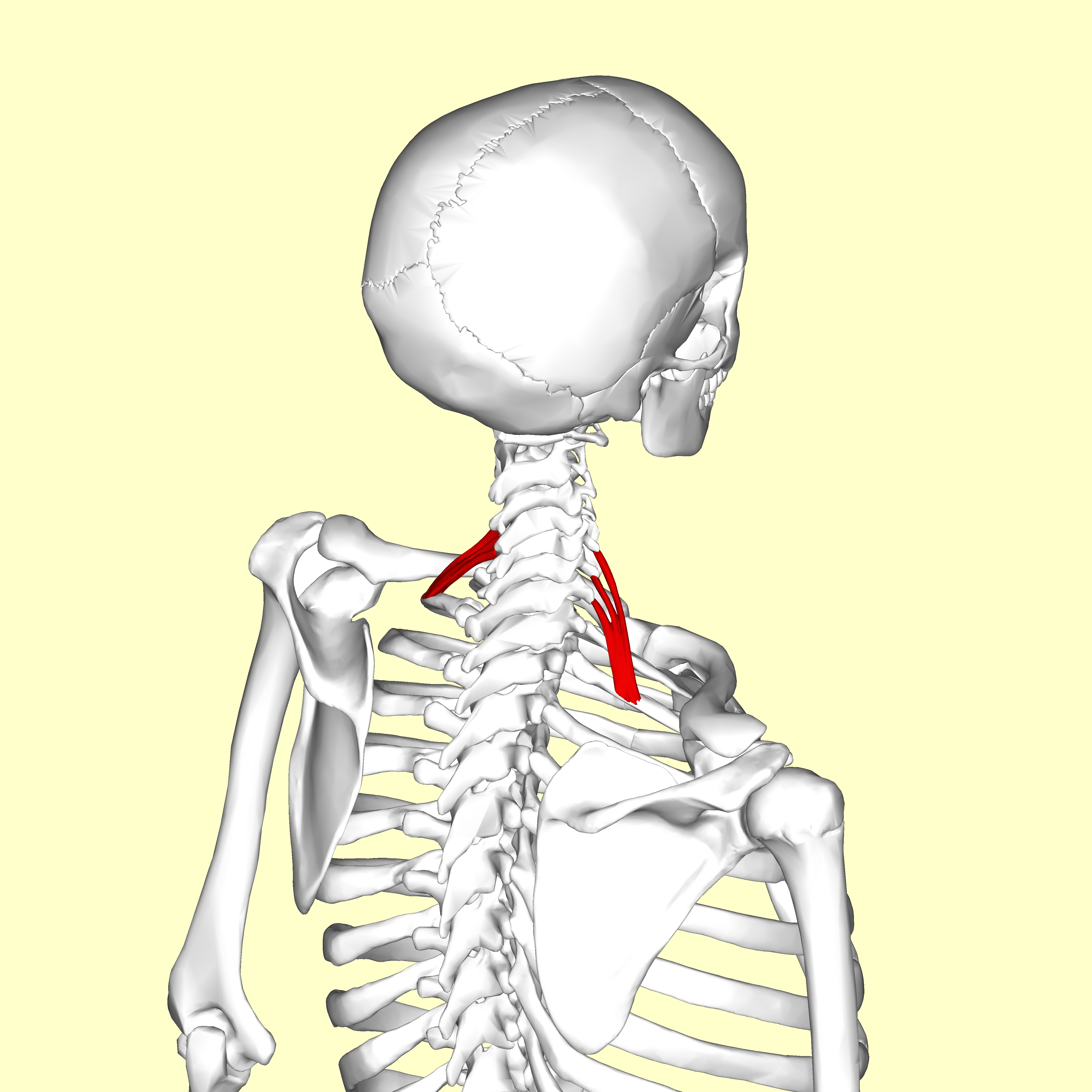
Posterior scalene

=== Posterior scalene ===
The posterior scalene, (Latin: scalenus posterior) is the smallest and most deeply seated of the scalene muscles. It arises, by two or three separate tendons, from the posterior tubercles of the transverse processes of the fourth, fifth and sixth cervical vertebrae, and is inserted by a thin tendon into the outer surface of the second rib, behind the attachment of the anterior scalene. It is supplied by cervical nerves C5, C6 and C7. It is occasionally blended with the middle scalene.

=== Variation ===
A fourth muscle, the scalenus minimus (Sibson's muscle), is sometimes present behind the lower portion of the anterior scalene.

== Function ==
The anterior and middle scalene muscles lift the first rib and bend the neck to the same side as the acting muscle; the posterior scalene lifts the second rib and tilts the neck to the same side.

Because they elevate the upper ribs, they also act as accessory muscles of respiration, along with the sternocleidomastoids.

=== Relations ===
The scalene muscles have an important relationship to other structures in the neck. The brachial plexus and subclavian artery pass between the anterior and middle scalenes. The subclavian vein and phrenic nerve pass anteriorly to the anterior scalene as the muscle crosses over the first rib. The phrenic nerve is oriented vertically as it passes in front of the anterior scalene, while the subclavian vein is oriented horizontally as it passes in front of the anterior scalene muscle.

The passing of the brachial plexus and the subclavian artery through the space of the anterior and middle scalene muscles constitute the scalene hiatus (the term "scalene fissure" is also used). The region in which this lies is referred to as the scaleotracheal fossa. It is bounded by the clavicle inferior anteriorly, the trachea medially, posteriorly by the trapezius, and anteriorly by the platysma muscle.

== Clinical significance ==
The anterior and middle scalene muscles can be involved in certain forms of thoracic outlet syndrome as well as myofascial pain syndrome, the symptoms of which may mimic a spinal disc herniation of the cervical vertebrae.

Since the nerves of the brachial plexus pass through the space between the anterior and middle scalene muscles, that area is sometimes targeted with the administration of regional anesthesia by an anesthesia provider. The nerve block, called an interscalene block, may be performed prior to arm or shoulder surgery.

According to the medical codes in the 2016 Procedural Coding Expert, published by the American Academy of Professional Coders, for Current Procedural Terminology (CPT) and other medical codes, the scalenus anticus muscle can be divided by reparative or reconstructive surgery, with (# 21705) or without (# 21700) resection of the cervical rib.

== History ==
The scalenes used to be known as the lateral vertebral muscles.

=== Etymology ===
The muscles are named from Greek σκαληνός (skalēnós), meaning 'uneven' as the pairs are all of differing length.

== Additional images ==
Musculi colli base

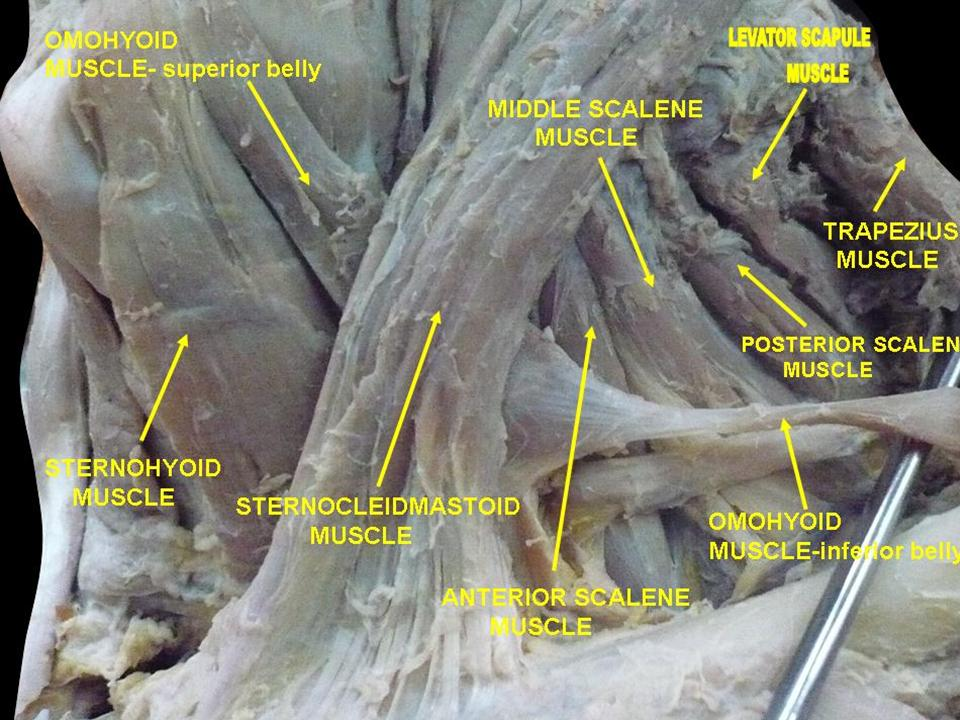
Scalene muscles. Muscles of the neck. Lateral view.

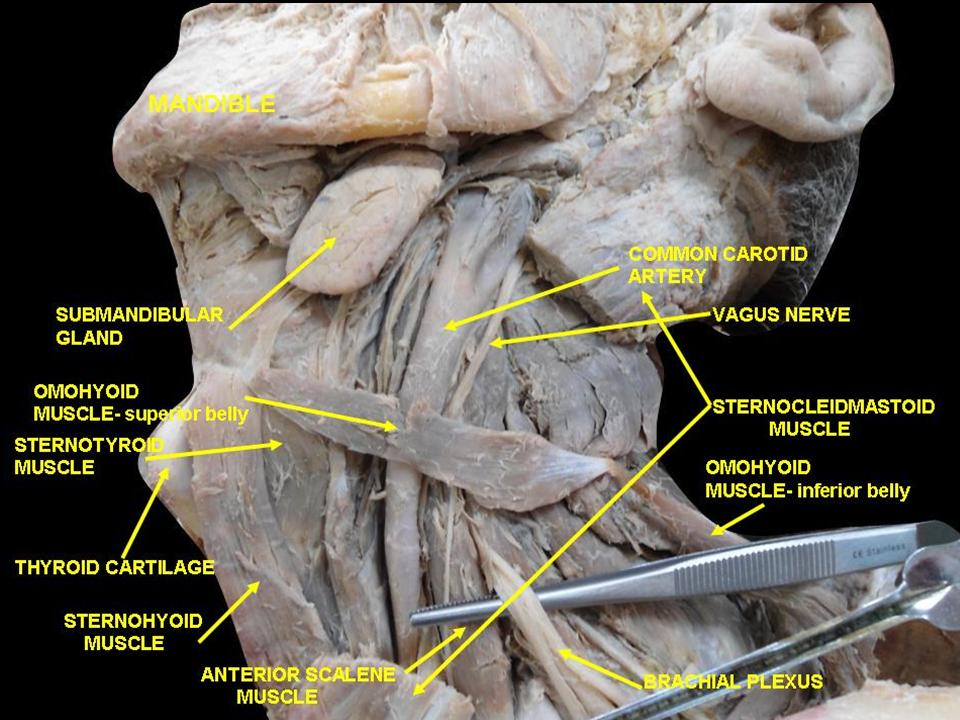
Scalene muscles. Muscles of the neck. Lateral view.

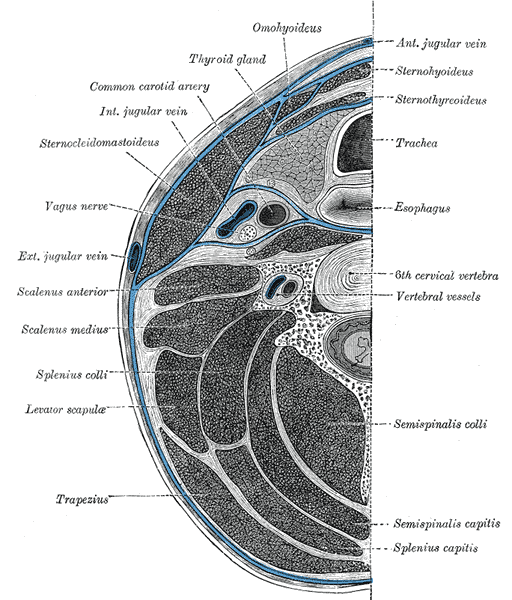
Section of the neck at about the level of the sixth cervical vertebra. Showing the arrangement of the fascia colli.
