= Superior thoracic artery =

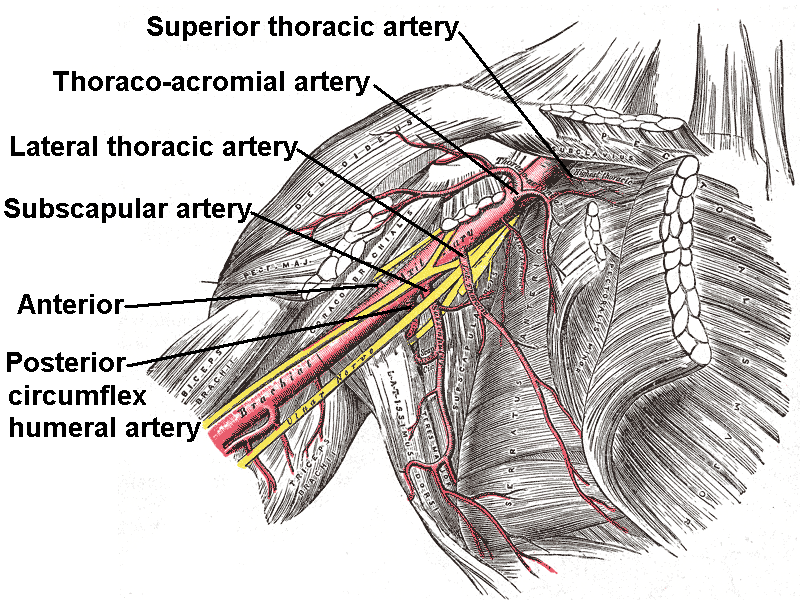
- The axillary artery and its branches (superior throracic artery is the upper-rightmost artery)

Details
- Source: Axillary artery
- Branches: Anastomoses with intercostal arteries and/or internal thoracic artery
- Supplies: Serratus anterior

Identifiers
- Latin: arteria thoracica superior
- TA98: A12.2.09.004
- TA2: 4618
- FMA: 22668

The superior thoracic artery (highest thoracic artery) is a small artery located near the armpit. It usually originates from (the first division of) the axillary artery, but can instead originate from the thoracoacromial artery (itself a branch of the second division of the axillary artery). It supplies the pectoralis minor and major muscles, and the chest wall.

== Anatomy ==
=== Course and relations ===
It passes anteromedially along medial upper border of the pectoralis before passing between pectoralis minor and pectoralis major to reach the chest wall.

=== Anastomoses ===
It forms anastomoses with the internal thoracic artery, and upper intercostal arteries.
