= Axioappendicular muscles =

Muscles that extend between the axial and (superior or inferior) appendicular skeletons

The Axioappendicular muscles are the muscles that extend between the axial and (superior or inferior) appendicular skeletons. The two groups of Axioappendicular muscles are the anterior axioappendicular muscles and the posterior axioappendicular muscles.

== Anterior axioappendicular muscles ==
The anterior axioappendicular muscles are the:

- Pectoralis major
- Pectoralis minor
- Subclavius
- Serratus anterior

== Posterior axioappendicular muscles ==
The posterior axioappendicular muscles are described as two sub-groups:

- Superficial Posterior Axioappendicular muscles (or the extrinsic shoulder muscles)
  - Trapezius
  - Latissimus dorsi
- Deep Posterior Axioappendicular muscles (or the intrinsic shoulder muscles)
  - Levator scapulae
  - Rhomboid minor
  - Rhomboid major
