= Clavipectoral =

Clavipectoral may refer to:

- Clavipectoral fascia
- Clavipectoral triangle
