= Humeral circumflex artery =

Humeral circumflex artery can refer to:

- Posterior humeral circumflex artery
- Anterior humeral circumflex artery

== See also ==
- Circumflex branch of left coronary artery
