= Subclavius muscle =

Muscle between the clavicle and first rib

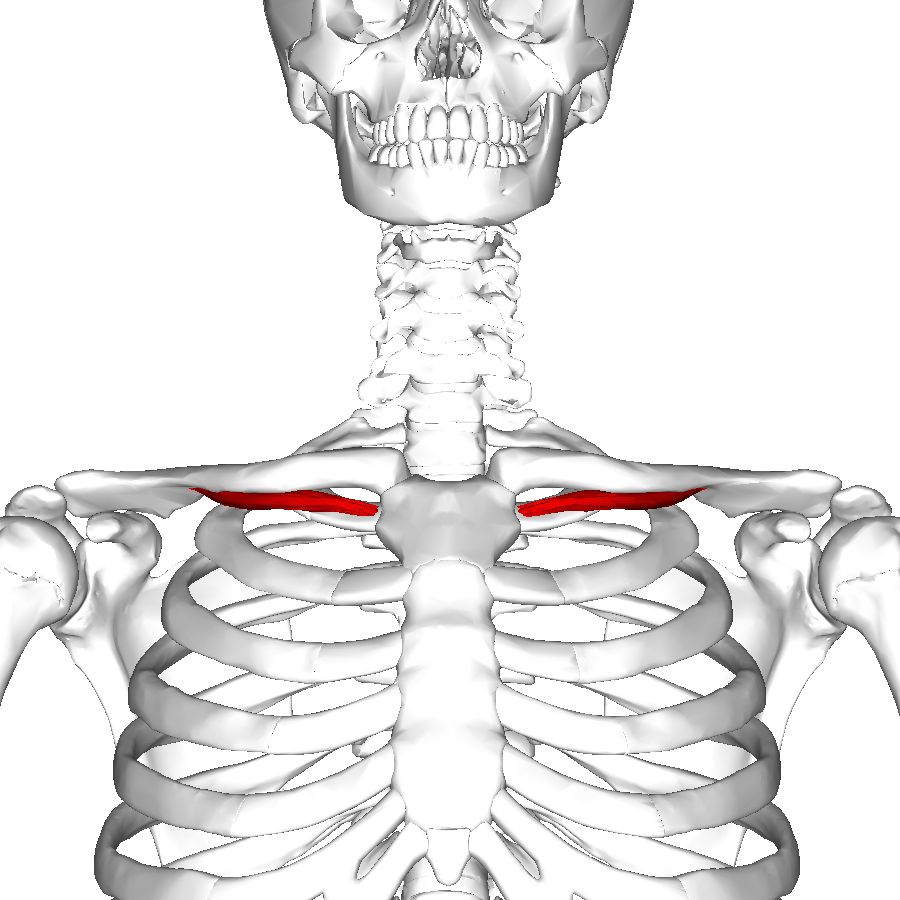
- Subclavius muscle (shown in red).

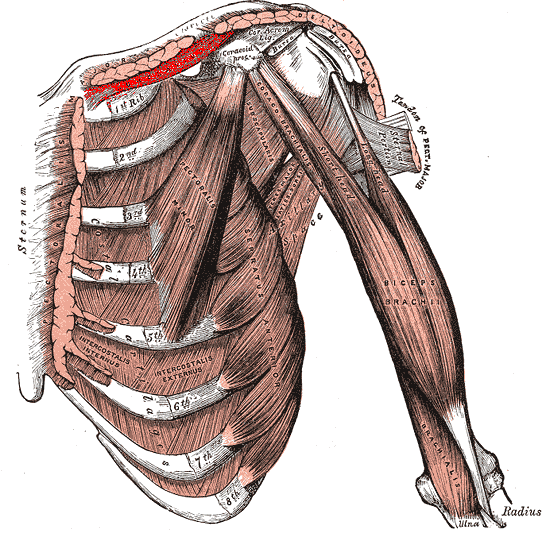
- Deep muscles of the chest and front of the arm, with the boundaries of the axilla. (Subclavius visible at upper left, above first rib.)

Details
- Origin: First rib and cartilage
- Insertion: Subclavian groove of clavicle (inferior surface of middle one third of the clavicle)
- Artery: Thoracoacromial trunk, clavicular branch
- Nerve: Subclavian nerve
- Actions: Depression of clavicle elevation of first rib

Identifiers
- Latin: musculus subclavius
- TA98: A04.4.01.007
- TA2: 2306
- FMA: 13410

The subclavius is a small triangular muscle, placed between the clavicle and the first rib. Along with the pectoralis major and pectoralis minor muscles, the subclavius muscle makes up the anterior axioappendicular muscles, also known as anterior wall of the axilla.

== Structure ==
It arises by a short, thick tendon from the first rib and its cartilage at their junction, in front of the costoclavicular ligament.

The fleshy fibers proceed obliquely superolaterally, to be inserted into the groove on the under surface of the clavicle.

=== Innervation ===
The nerve to subclavius (or subclavian nerve) innervates the muscle. This arises from the junction of the fifth and sixth cervical nerves, from the superior/upper trunk of the brachial plexus.

=== Variation ===
Insertion into coracoid process instead of clavicle or into both clavicle and coracoid process. Sternoscapular fasciculus to the upper border of scapula. Sternoclavicularis from manubrium to clavicle between pectoralis major and coracoclavicular fascia. Rarely, the subclavius may be missing entirely.

== Function ==
It depresses the lateral clavicle, acts to stabilize the clavicle while the shoulder moves the arm. It also raises the first rib while lowering the clavicle during breathing.

The subclavius protects the underlying brachial plexus and subclavian vessels from a broken clavicle—the most frequently broken long bone.

== Additional images ==
Subclavius muscle (shown in red). Humerus and scapula are shown in semi-transparent. Animation.

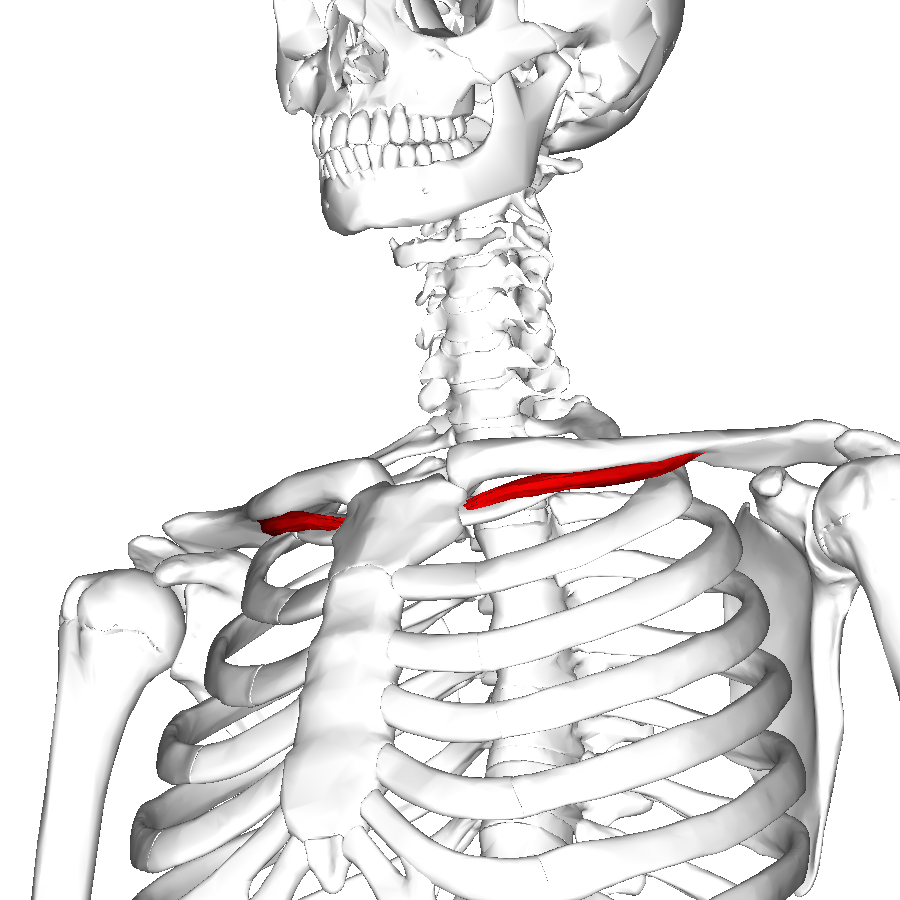
Subclavius muscle (shown in red).

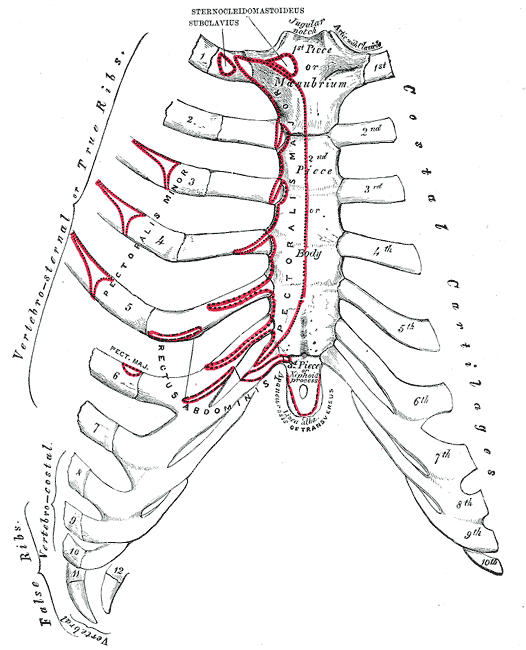
Anterior surface of sternum and costal cartilages.

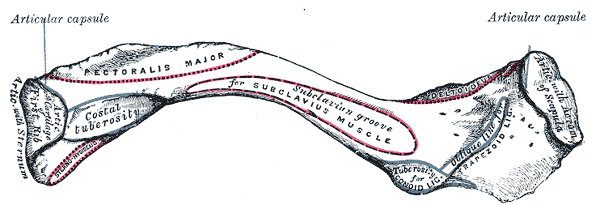
Left clavicle. Inferior surface.

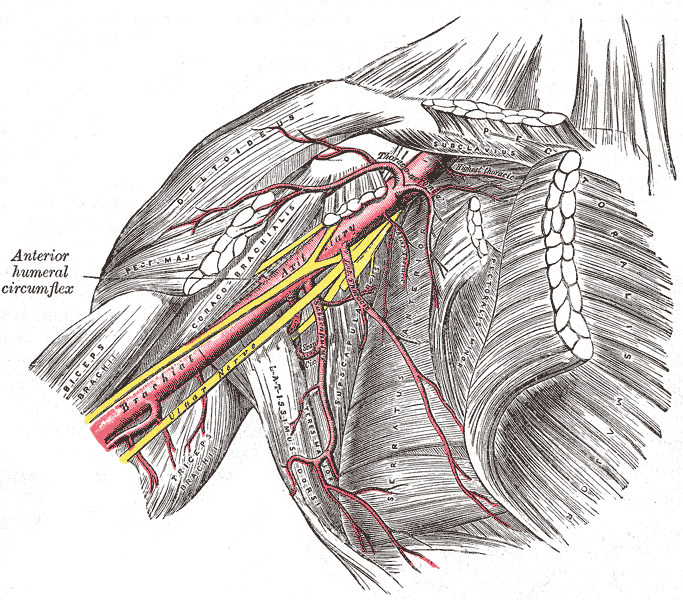
The axillary artery and its branches.

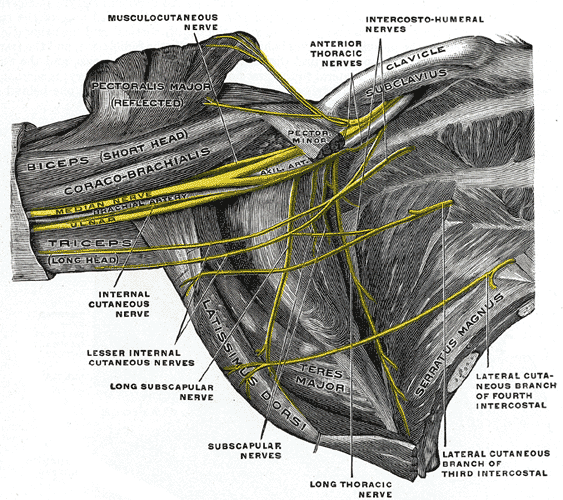
The right brachial plexus (infraclavicular portion) in the axillary fossa; viewed from below and in front.

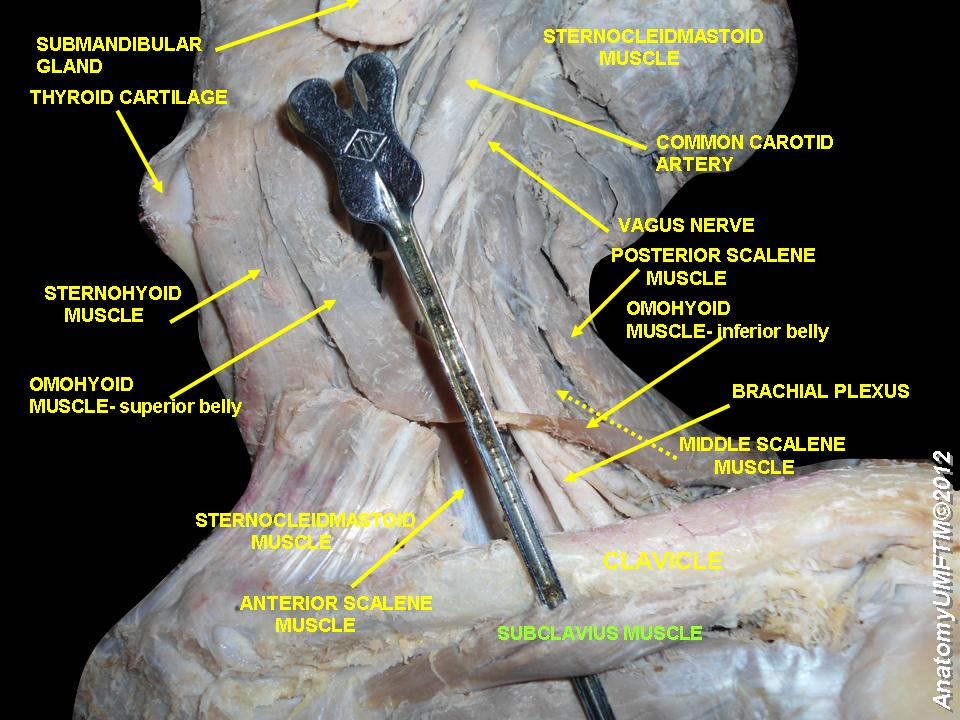
Subclavius muscle - left view

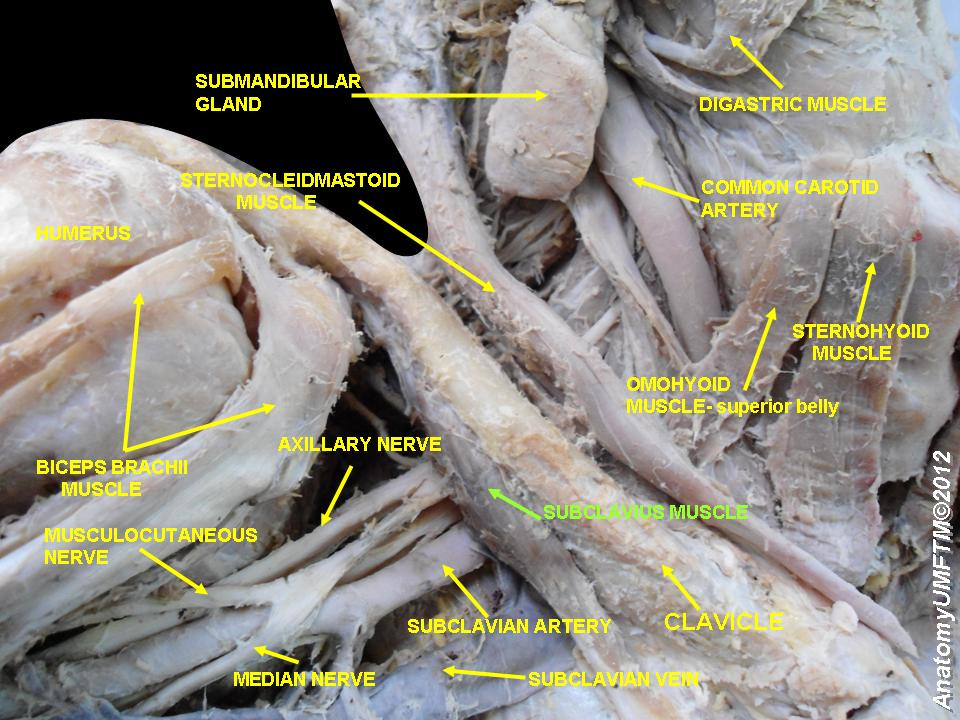
Subclavius muscle- right view

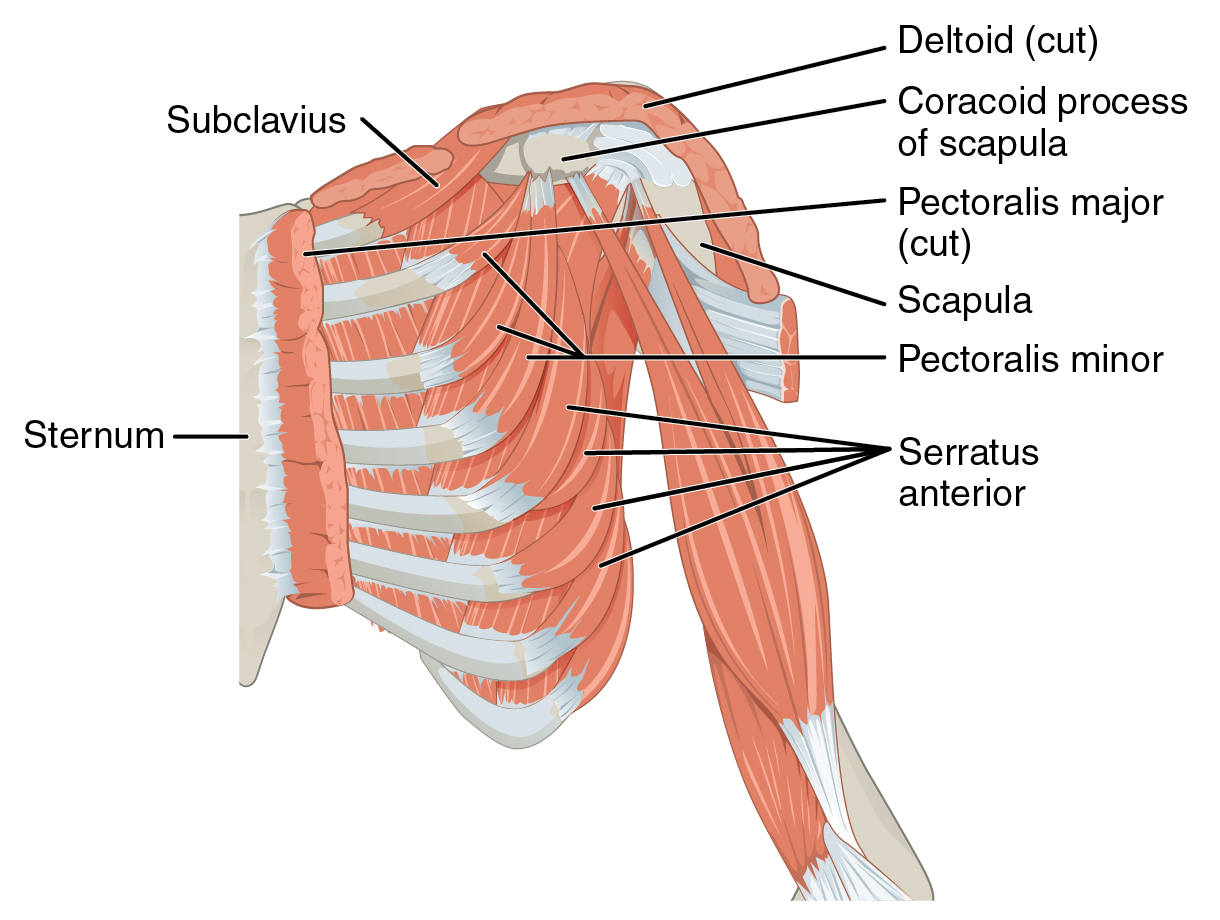
Subclavius (labeled top left) — frontal view
