= Subclavian groove =

Feature of the human collarbone

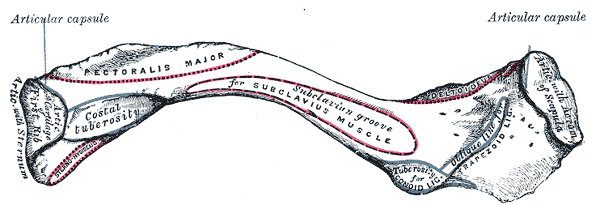
- Left clavicle. Inferior surface. (Subclavian groove visible at center.)

Details

Identifiers
- Latin: sulcus musculi subclavii
- TA98: A02.4.02.006
- TA2: 1173
- FMA: 23343

On the medial part of the clavicle is a broad rough surface, the costal tuberosity (rhomboid impression), rather more than 2 cm. in length, for the attachment of the costoclavicular ligament. The rest of this surface is occupied by a groove, which gives attachment to the Subclavius; the coracoclavicular fascia, which splits to enclose the muscle, is attached to the margins of the groove. Not infrequently this groove is subdivided longitudinally by a line which gives attachment to the intermuscular septum of the Subclavius.
