= Axillary artery =

Large blood vessel bringing oxygenated blood to the thorax

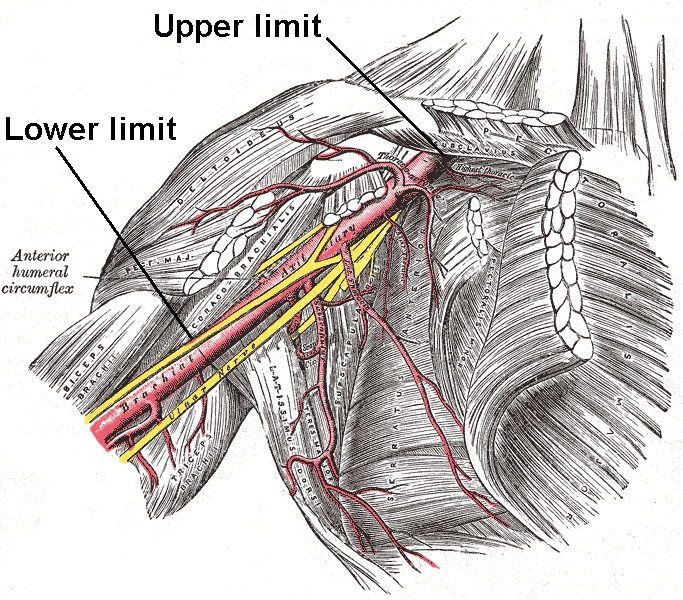
- Axillary artery and its branches—anterior view of right upper limb and thorax. Upper and lower limits labeled.

- The pectoralis minor muscle is used as a landmark for dividing the axillary artery into three parts.

Details
- Source: Subclavian artery
- Branches: Superior thoracic thoracoacromial lateral thoracic subscapular anterior circumflex humeral posterior circumflex humeral continues as brachial artery
- Vein: Axillary vein
- Supplies: Axilla

Identifiers
- Latin: arteria axillaris
- MeSH: D001366
- TA98: A12.2.09.002
- TA2: 4616
- FMA: 22654

In human anatomy, the axillary artery is a large blood vessel that conveys oxygenated blood to the lateral aspect of the thorax, the axilla (armpit) and the upper limb. Its origin is at the lateral margin of the first rib, before which it is called the subclavian artery.

After passing the lower margin of teres major it becomes the brachial artery.

== Structure ==
The axillary artery is often referred to as having three parts, with these divisions based on its location relative to the pectoralis minor muscle, which is superficial to the artery.

- First part – the part of the artery superior to the pectoralis minor
- Second part – the part of the artery posterior to the pectoralis minor
- Third part – the part of the artery inferior to the pectoralis minor.

=== Relations ===
The axillary artery is accompanied by the axillary vein, which lies medial to the artery, along its length.

In the axilla, the axillary artery is surrounded by the brachial plexus. The second part of the axillary artery is the reference for the locational descriptions of the cords in the brachial plexus. For example, the posterior cord of the brachial plexus is so named because it lies posterior to the second part of the artery.

=== Branches ===
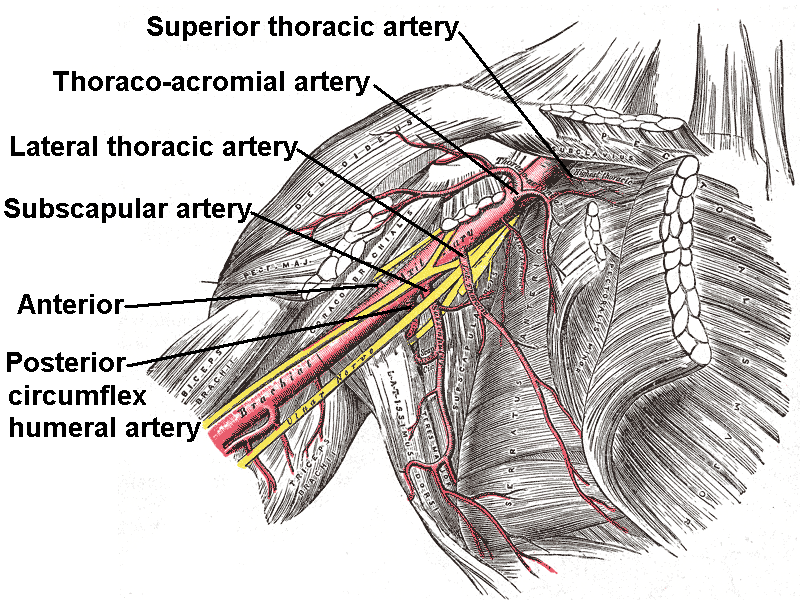
Branches of axillary artery

The axillary artery has several smaller branches. The branches can be remembered, in order, when traveling from the heart, with the mnemonics "Seek The Lord, Serve All People", "Summertime: The Lakers Schedule Another Parade", "Some Traumas Leave Scars And Pain", or "She Tastes Like Sweet Apple Pie." The origin of these branches is highly variable (e.g. the posterior and anterior circumflex arteries often have a common trunk). An arterial branch is named for its course, not its origin.

- First part (1 branch)
  - Superior thoracic artery (Supreme thoracic artery)
- Second part (2 branches)
  - Thoraco-acromial artery
  - Lateral thoracic artery. If the lateral thoracic artery is not branching from the axillary artery, will most likely branch from the following (in order of likelihood): (1) thoracoacromial, (2) third part of axillary artery, (3) suprascapular artery, (4) subscapular artery
- Third part (3 branches)
  - Subscapular artery
  - Anterior humeral circumflex artery
  - Posterior humeral circumflex artery

Continues as the brachial artery past the inferior border of the teres major.

== Clinical significance ==
The axillary artery can be safely clamped without endangering the arm, but only in a location proximal to the origin of the subscapular artery (and distal to the thyrocervical trunk of the subclavian artery). The anastomotic network surrounding the scapula provides an alternate path for collateral circulation to the arm from arteries including the dorsal scapular artery and suprascapular artery.

The right axillary artery is often used as an arterial cannulation site in cardiac surgery, particularly for repair of aortic dissection and replacement of the ascending aorta and aortic arch.

== Additional images ==
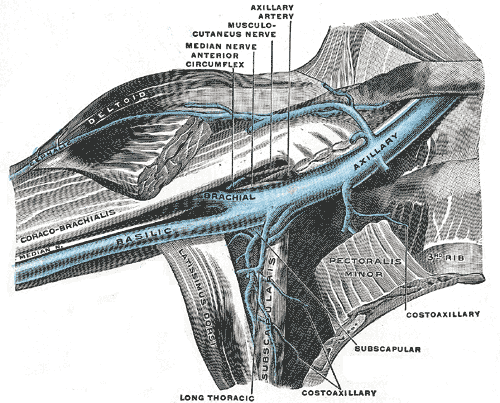
The veins of the right axilla, viewed from in front.

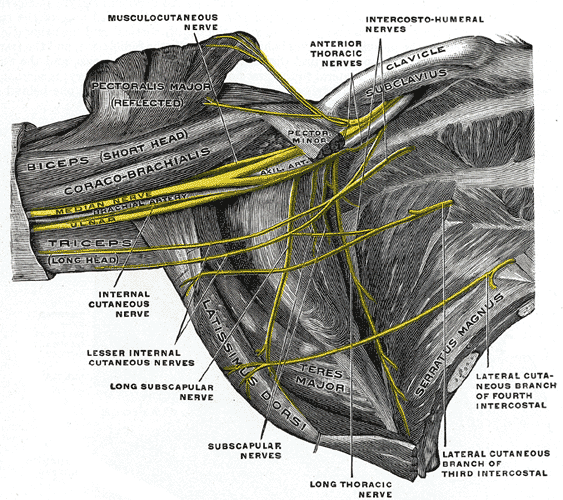
The right brachial plexus (infraclavicular portion) in the axillary fossa; viewed from below and in front.

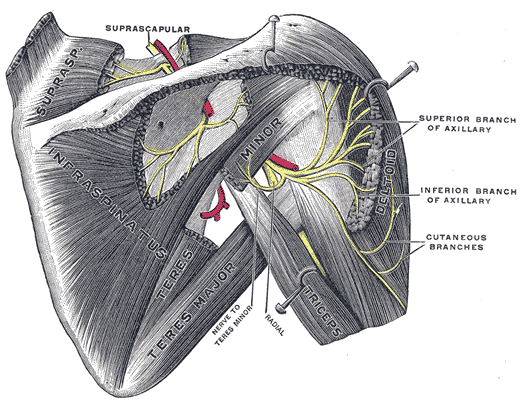
Suprascapular and axillary nerves of right side, seen from behind.

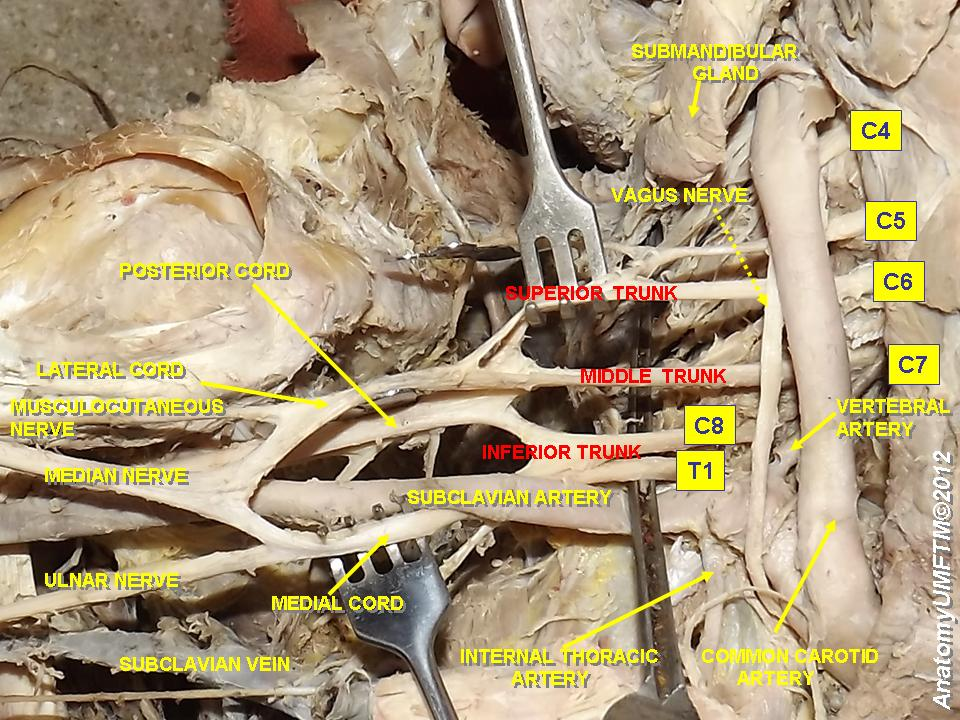
Brachial plexus and axillary artery

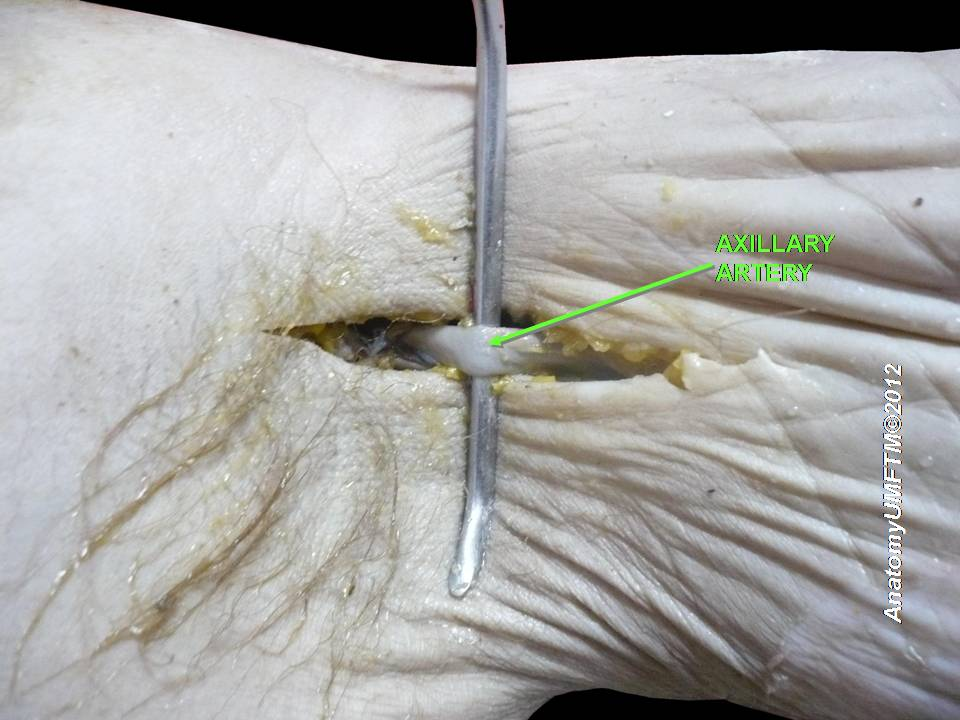
Axillary artery

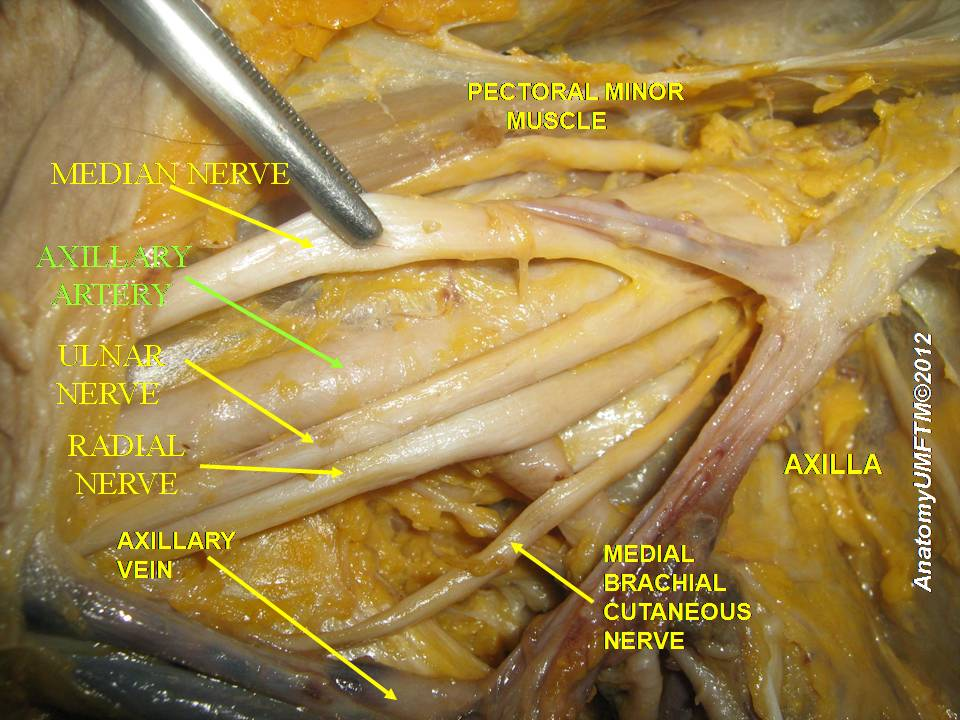
Axillary artery

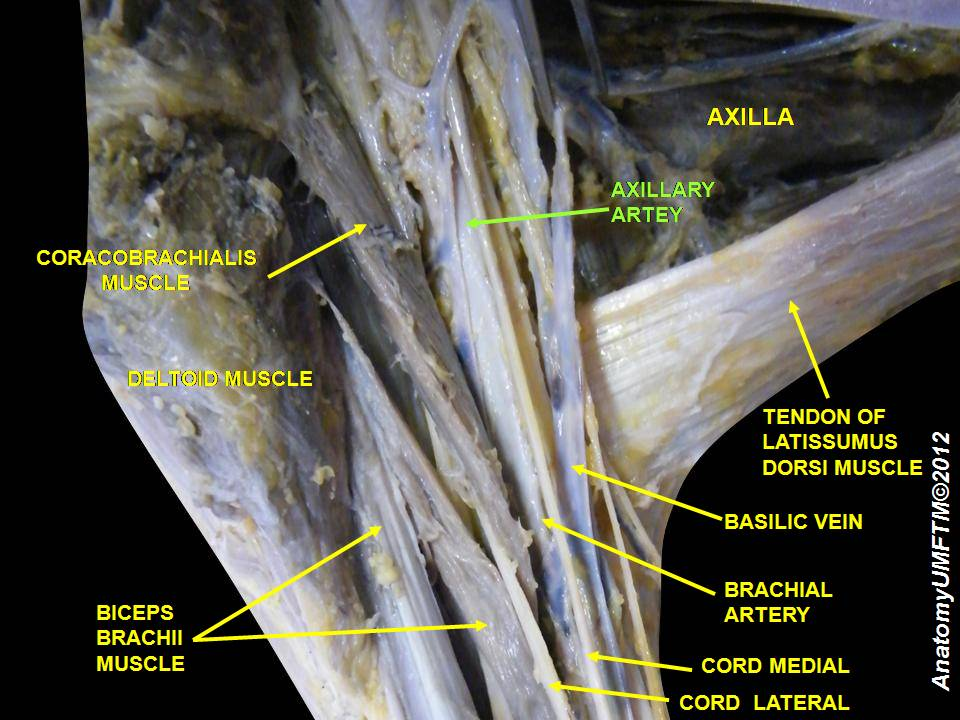
Axillary artery

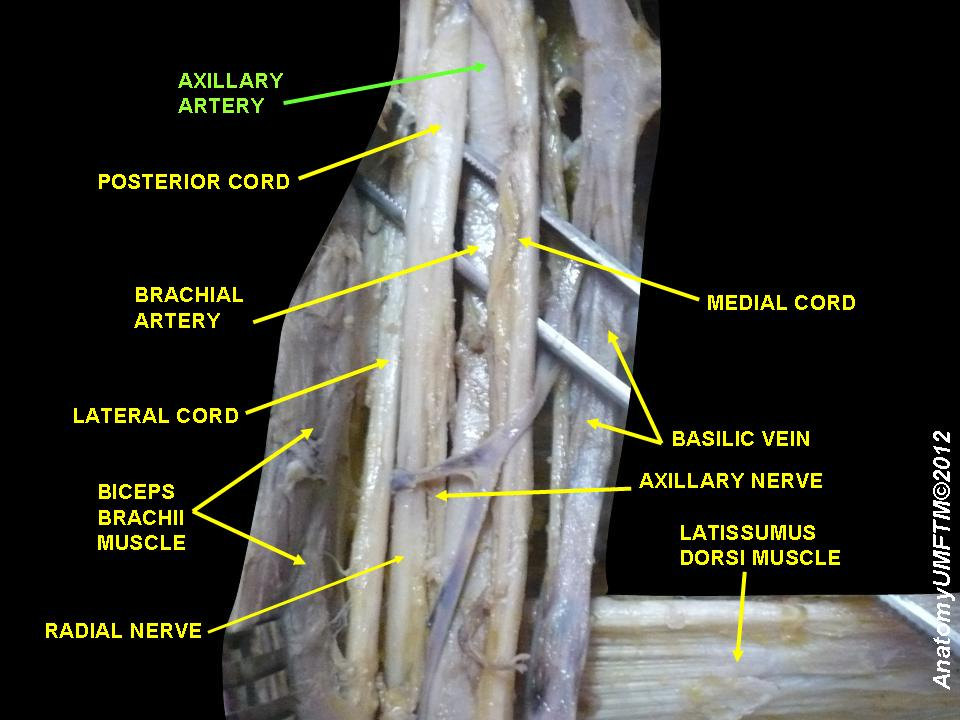
Axillary artery

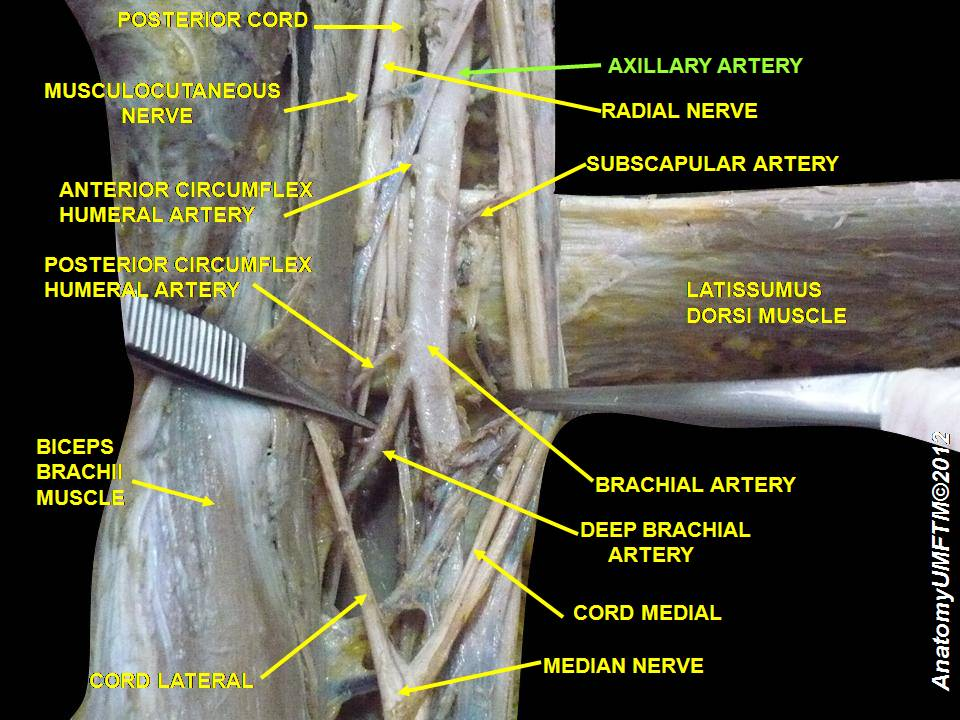
Axillary artery

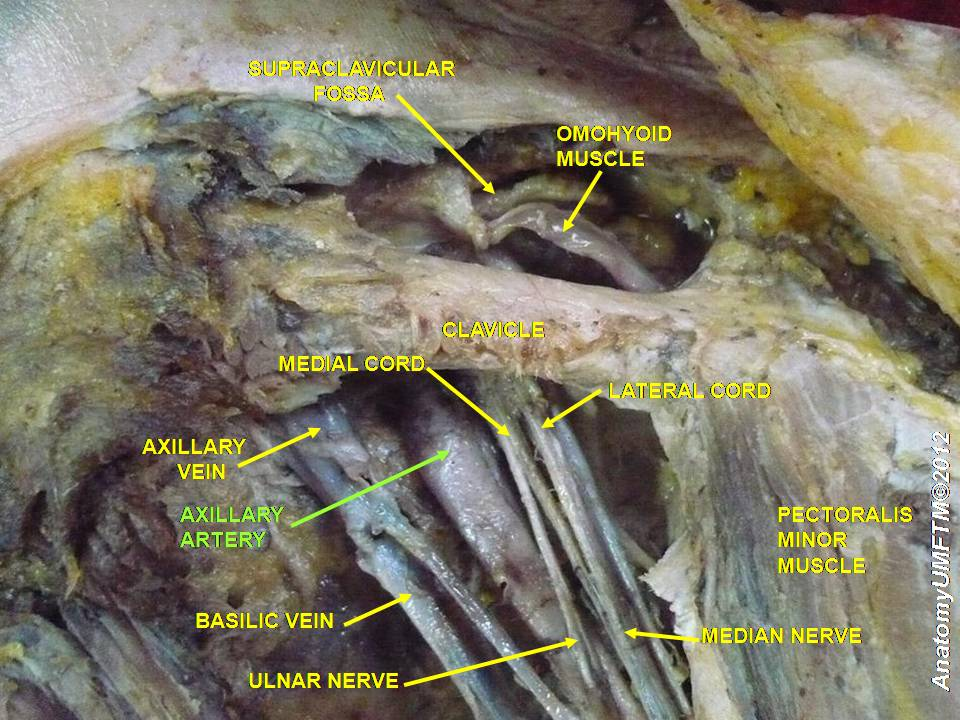
Axillary artery
