= Clavipectoral fascia =

Fascia above the axillary facia

Details

Identifiers
- Latin: fascia clavipectoralis
- TA98: A04.4.01.018
- TA2: 2318
- FMA: 37340

The clavipectoral fascia (costocoracoid membrane; coracoclavicular fascia) is a strong fascia situated under cover of the clavicular portion of the pectoralis major.

It occupies the interval between the pectoralis minor and subclavius, and protects the axillary vein and artery, and axillary nerve.

Traced upward, it splits to enclose the subclavius, and its two layers are attached to the clavicle, one in front of and the other behind the muscle; the deep layer fuses with the deep cervical fascia and with the sheath of the axillary vessels.

Medially, it blends with the fascia covering the first two intercostal spaces, and is attached also to the first rib medial to the origin of the subclavius.

Laterally, it is very thick and dense, and is attached to the coracoid process.

The portion extending from the first rib to the coracoid process is often whiter and denser than the rest, and is sometimes called the costocoracoid membrane.

Below this. it is thin, and at the upper border of the pectoralis minor, it splits into two layers to invest the muscle; from the lower border of the pectoralis minor, it is continued downward to join the axillary fascia, and lateralward to join the fascia over the short head of the biceps brachii.

The clavipectoral fascia is pierced by the cephalic vein, thoracoacromial artery and vein, lymphatics and lateral pectoral nerve.

== See also ==
- Suspensory ligament of axilla
