= Anatomical variation =

Difference between the anatomical structures

An anatomical variation, anatomical variant, or anatomical variability is a presentation of body structure with morphological features different from those that are typically described in the majority of individuals. Anatomical variations are categorized into three types including morphometric (size or shape), consistency (present or absent), and spatial (proximal/distal or right/left).

Variations are seen as normal in the sense that they are found consistently among different individuals, are mostly without symptoms, and are termed anatomical variations rather than abnormalities.

Anatomical variations are mainly caused by genetics and may vary considerably between different populations. The rate of variation considerably differs between single organs, particularly in muscles. Knowledge of anatomical variations is important in order to distinguish them from pathological conditions.

A very early paper published in 1898, presented anatomic variations to have a wide range and significance, and before the use of X-ray technology, anatomic variations were mostly only found on cadaver studies. The use of imaging techniques have defined many such variations.

Some variations are found in different species such as polydactyly, having more than the usual number of digits.

== Variants of structures ==
=== Muscles ===
Kopsch gave a detailed listing of muscle variations. These included the absence of muscles; muscles that were doubled; muscles that were divided into two or more parts; an increase or decrease in the origin or insertion of the muscle; and the joining to adjacent organs.

The palmaris longus muscle in the forearm is sometimes absent, as is the plantaris muscle in the leg.

The sternalis muscle is a variant that lies in front of the pectoralis major and may show up on a mammogram.

=== Bones ===
Usually there are five lumbar vertebrae but sometimes there are six, and sometimes there are four.

=== Joints ===
A discoid meniscus is a rare thickened lateral meniscus in the knee joint that can sometimes be swollen and painful.

=== Organs ===
The lungs are subject to anatomical variations.

== See also ==
- Supernumerary body part
- Visible difference
