= Thoracoacromial artery =

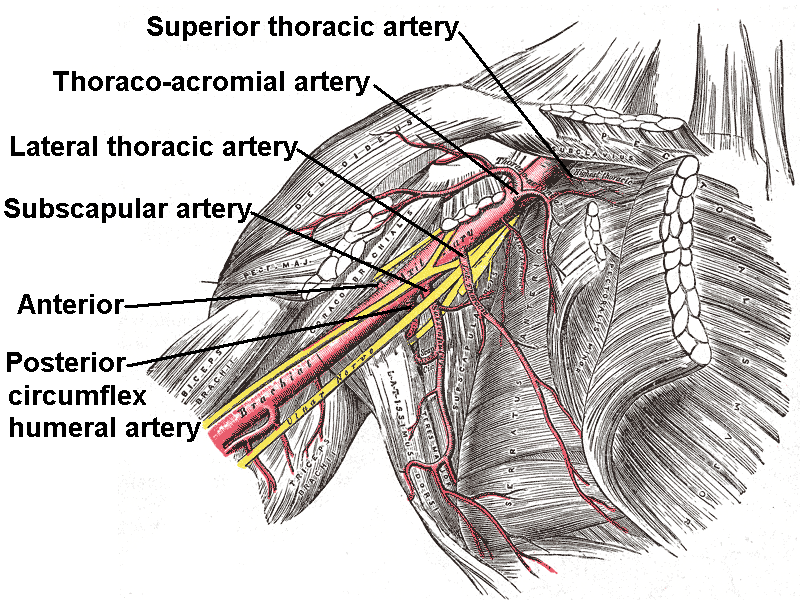
- Branches of axillary artery, including thoracoacromial artery

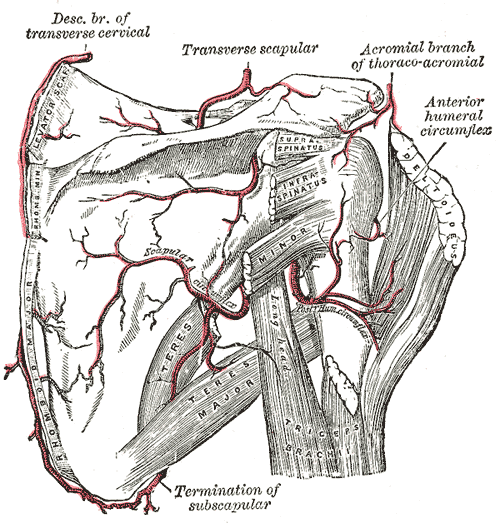
- The scapular and circumflex arteries. (Thoracoacromial branch of thoracoacromial labeled at upper right.)

Details
- Source: Axillary artery

Identifiers
- Latin: arteria thoracoacromialis
- TA98: A12.2.09.005
- TA2: 4619
- FMA: 22671

The thoracoacromial artery (acromiothoracic artery; thoracic axis) is a short trunk that arises from the second part of the axillary artery, its origin being generally overlapped by the upper edge of the pectoralis minor.

== Structure ==
Projecting forward to the upper border of the Pectoralis minor, it pierces the coracoclavicular fascia and divides into four branches—pectoral, acromial, clavicular, and deltoid.

Branch	Description
Pectoral branch	Descends between the two pectorales, and is distributed to them and to the mamma, anastomosing with the intercostal branches of the internal thoracic artery and with the lateral thoracic.
Acromial branch	Runs laterally over the coracoid process and under the deltoideus, to which it gives branches; it then pierces that muscle and ends on the acromion in an arterial network formed by branches from the transverse scapular (a.k.a. suprascapular), thoracoacromial, and posterior humeral circumflex arteries.
Clavicular branch	Runs upward and medialward to the sternoclavicular joint, supplying this articulation, and the subclavius.
Deltoid (humeral) branch	Often arising with the acromial, it crosses over the pectoralis minor and passes in the same groove as the cephalic vein, between the pectoralis major and deltoideus, and gives branches to both muscles.

== Additional images ==
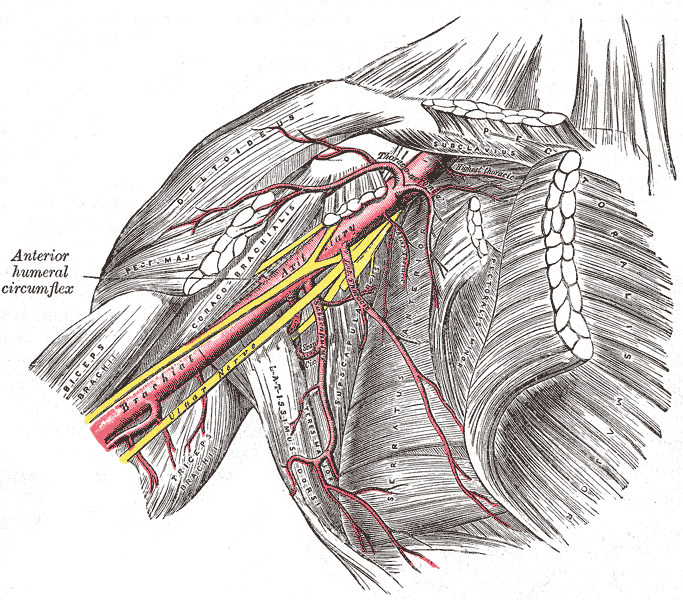
The axillary artery and its branches.
