= Sternalis muscle =

Muscle seen in some humans

Sternalis
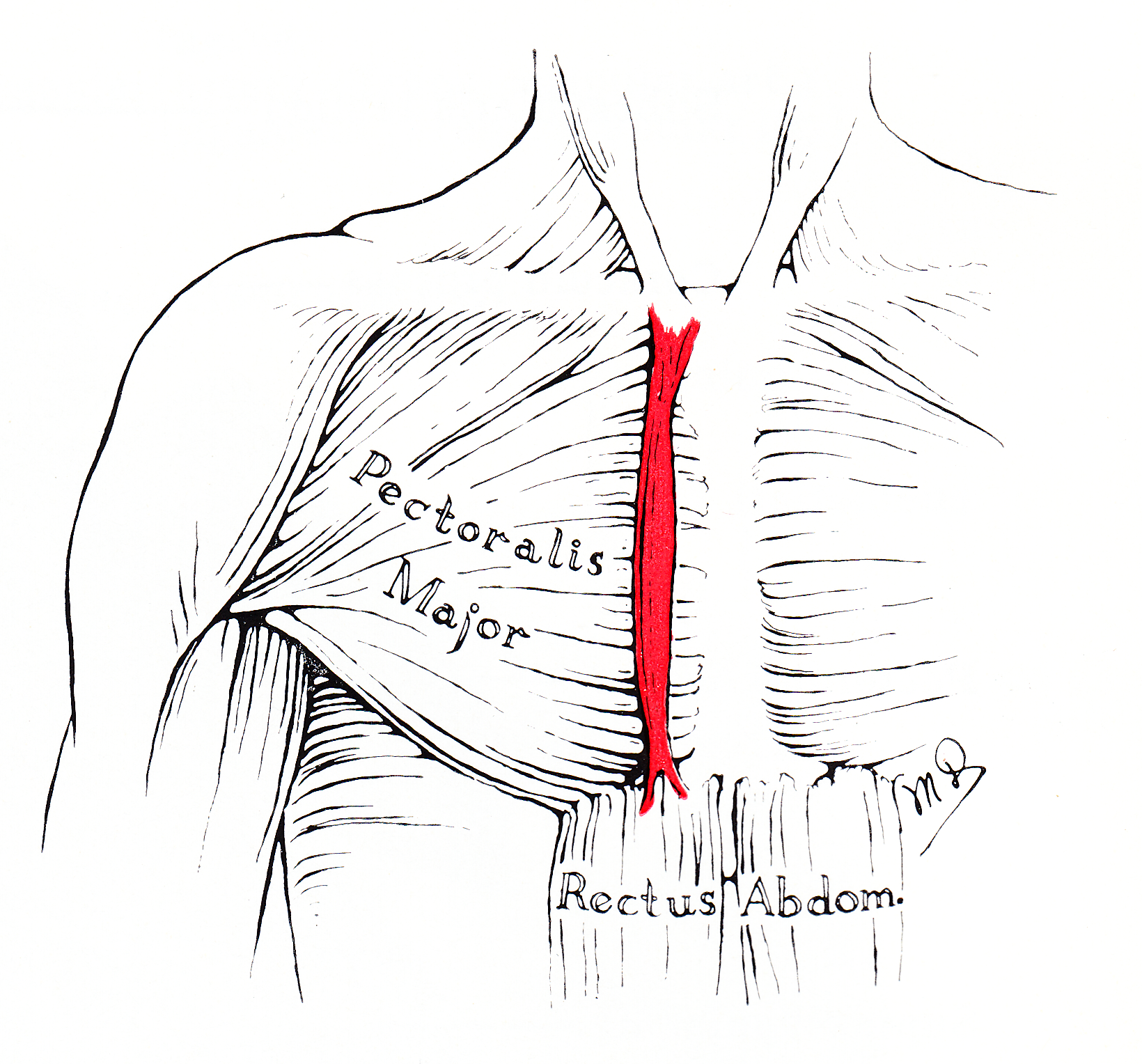
- Sternalis muscle, in line with rectus abdominis and sternomastoid, was found in 6% of 535 cadavers (R. N. Barlow)

Details
- Origin: Manubrium of sternum or clavicle
- Insertion: Xiphoid process, pectoral fascia, lower ribs, costal cartilages or rectus sheath

Identifiers
- Latin: musculus sternalis
- TA98: A04.4.01.001
- TA2: 2300
- FMA: 9717

The rectus sternalis muscle is an anatomical variation that lies in front of the sternal end of the pectoralis major parallel to the margin of the sternum. The sternalis muscle may be a variation of the pectoralis major or of the rectus abdominis.

== Structure ==
The sternalis is a muscle that runs along the anterior aspect of the body of the sternum. It lies superficially and parallel to the sternum. Its origin and insertion are variable. The sternalis muscle often originates from the upper part of the sternum and can display varying insertions such as the pectoral fascia, lower ribs, costal cartilages, rectus sheath, aponeurosis of the abdominal external oblique muscle. It may be present unilaterally or bilaterally. There is still a great deal of disagreement about its innervation and its embryonic origin.

In a review, it was reported that the muscle was innervated by the external or internal thoracic nerves in 55% of the cases, by the intercostal nerves in 43% of the cases, while the remaining cases were supplied by both nerves. However, innervation by the pectoral nerves has also been reported. This appears to indicate that the sternalis is not always derived from the same embryonic origin.

=== Prevalence ===
Cadaveric studies have shown that the sternalis muscle has a mean prevalence of around 7.8% in the population, with a significantly higher incidence of unilateral rather than bilateral presentation and a slightly higher incidence in females. The prevalence among subpopulations ranges from 0.5% to 23.5%—a possible reason for this sizable range could be that small, ill-defined, or tendinous fibers may or may not be accepted as constituting a sternalis muscle.

=== Variations ===
A 2014 study classified the sternalis into three types depending on morphology.

- Type I (single head and single belly)
- Type II (double-headed/multi-headed)
- Type III (double-bellied/multi-bellied)

Type I, the single head and single belly was seen in the majority of reported cases (58.5%), type II in 18.1%, and type III in 23.4%.

In addition to the above classification, triple-bellied/double-headed sternalis has also been reported.

== Function ==
There is no apparent physiological function of the sternalis muscle. However, there are many theories for a function. It may function as a proprioceptive sensor for thoracic wall movements. It may also take part in the movement of the shoulder joint or have an additional role in elevation of the chest wall.

== Clinical significance ==
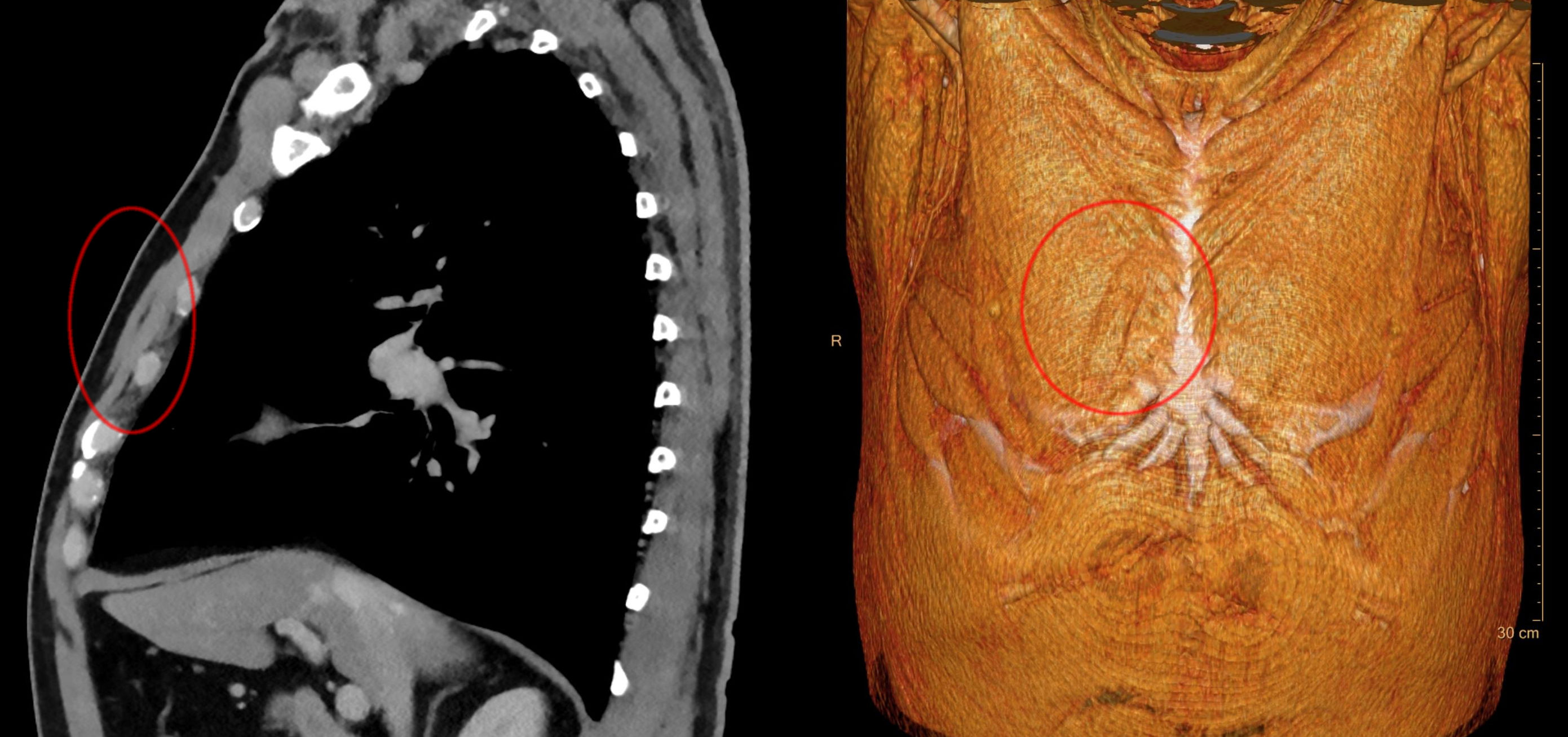
The presence of the sternalis in sagittal plane on CT (left) and on volume rendered CT 3D reconstruction (right).

The presence of the sternalis is asymptomatic but aesthetic complaints have been reported as it was reported to cause chest asymmetry or deviation of the nipple-areola complex. The presence of the sternalis may cause alterations in the electrocardiogram or confusion in mammography. However, there is a potential benefit of the muscle as it can be used as a flap in a reconstructive surgery of the head and neck and the anterior chest wall.

== History ==
The sternalis was first reported by Carbolius in 1604 and the name was first given by Turner in 1867. Different terminologies have been given to the sternalis due to its highly varied morphology and the disagreement on its embryonic origin. The sternalis was referred to as the rectus sternalis, sternalis brutorum, musculus sternalis, episternalis, parasternalis, presternalis, rectus sterni, rectus thoracis, rectus thoracicus superficialis, superficial rectus abdominis, japonicas, and thoracicus depending on studies.

== Additional images ==
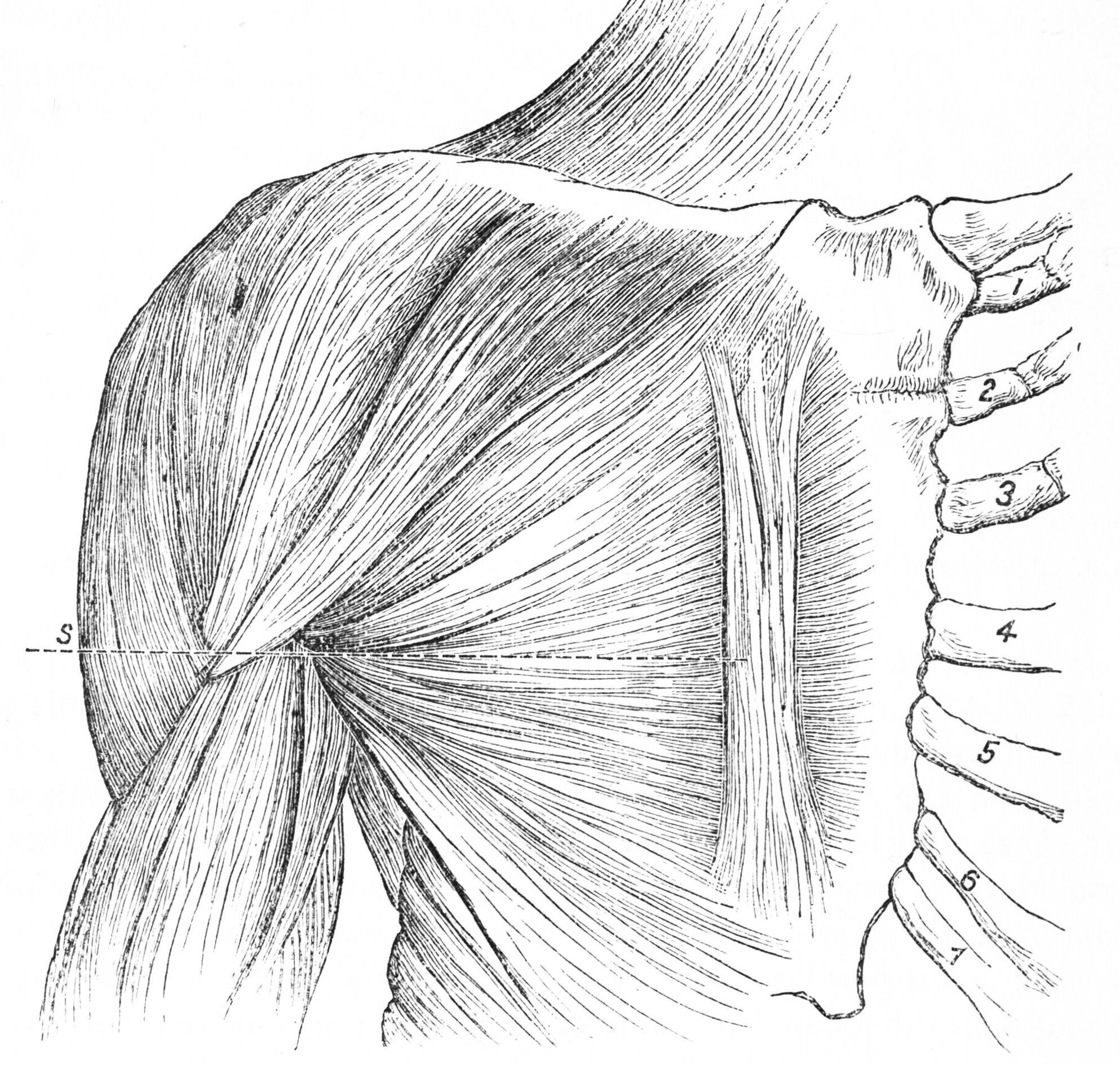
The sternalis muscle as it lies on top the pectoralis major.

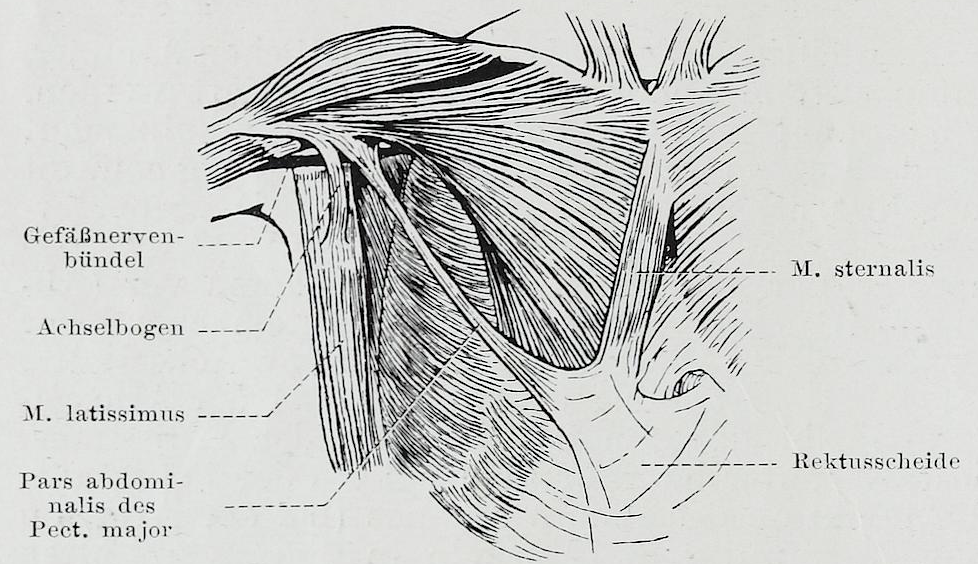
Sternalis muscle visible in an individual who also has an accessory abdominal pectoralis major, and an axillary arch of the latissimus dorsi.

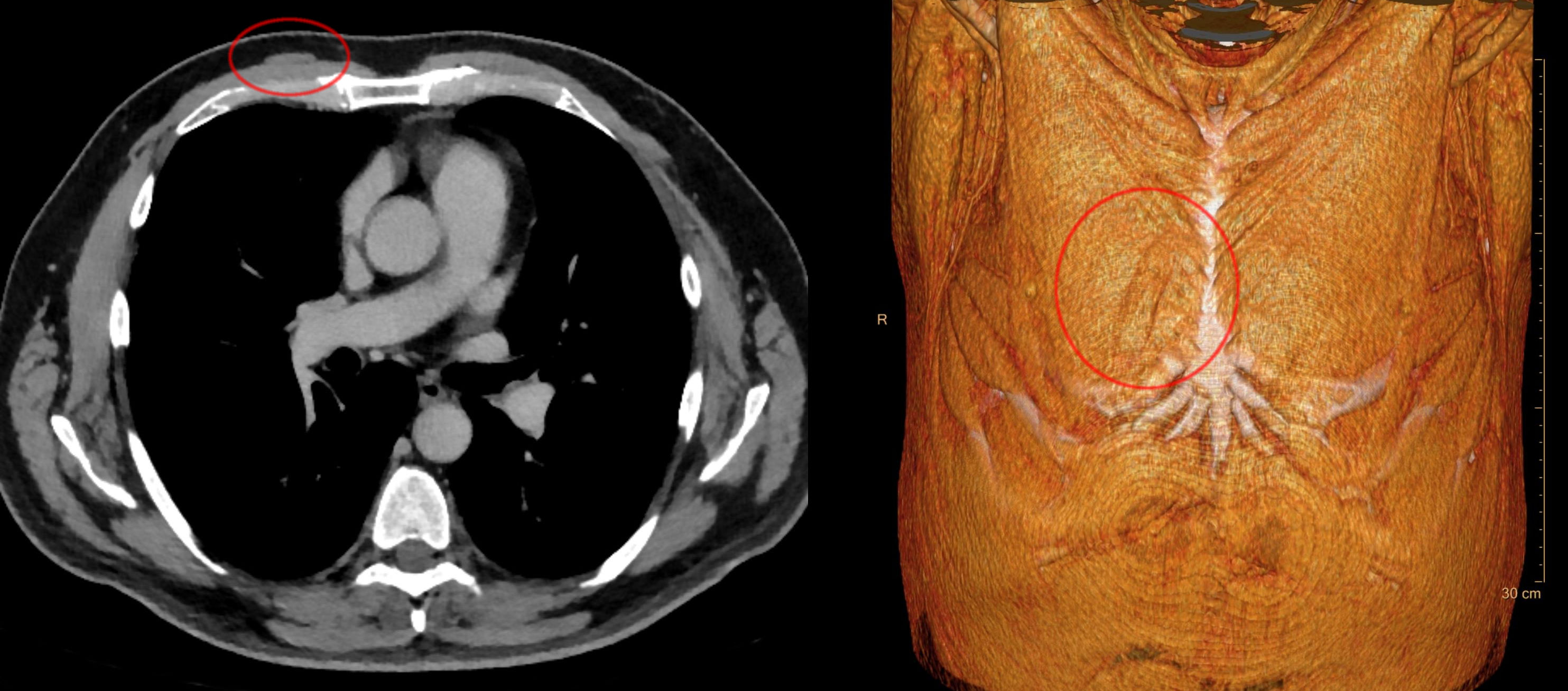
Musculus sternalis seen at axial CT and volume rendering.
