= Anterior humeral circumflex artery =

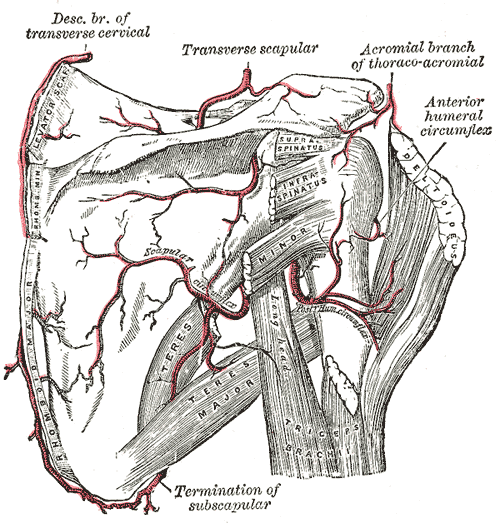
- The scapular and circumflex arteries (anterior humeral circumflex visible in upper right)

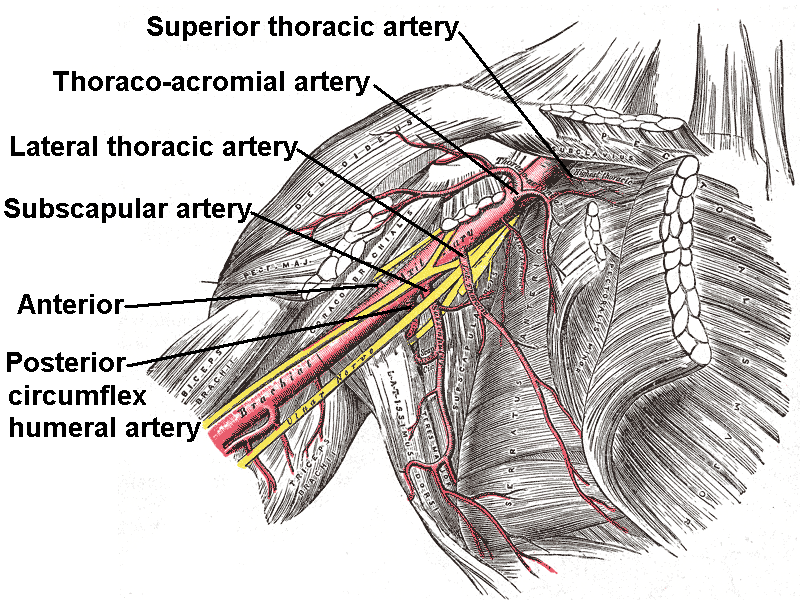
- The axillary artery and its branches, including anterior humeral circumflex

Details
- Source: Axillary artery

Identifiers
- Latin: arteria circumflexa humeri anterior
- TA98: A12.2.09.016
- TA2: 4630
- FMA: 22680

The anterior humeral circumflex artery (anterior circumflex artery, anterior circumflex humeral artery) is an artery in the arm. It is one of two circumflexing arteries that branch from the axillary artery, the other being the posterior humeral circumflex artery. The anterior humeral circumflex artery is considerably smaller than the posterior and arises nearly opposite to it, from the lateral side of the axillary artery.

== Anatomy ==
=== Course and relations ===
The anterior humeral circumflex artery passes horizontally posterior to the coracobrachialis muscle and short head of the biceps brachii muscle, in and anterior to of the surgical neck of the humerus. Upon reaching the intertubercular sulcus, it gives off an ascending branch which ascends along the sulcus to supply the head of the humerus and the shoulder-joint. It continues laterally, deep to the long head of the biceps brachii and the deltoideus muscle, before anastomosing with the posterior humeral circumflex artery.

== Additional images ==
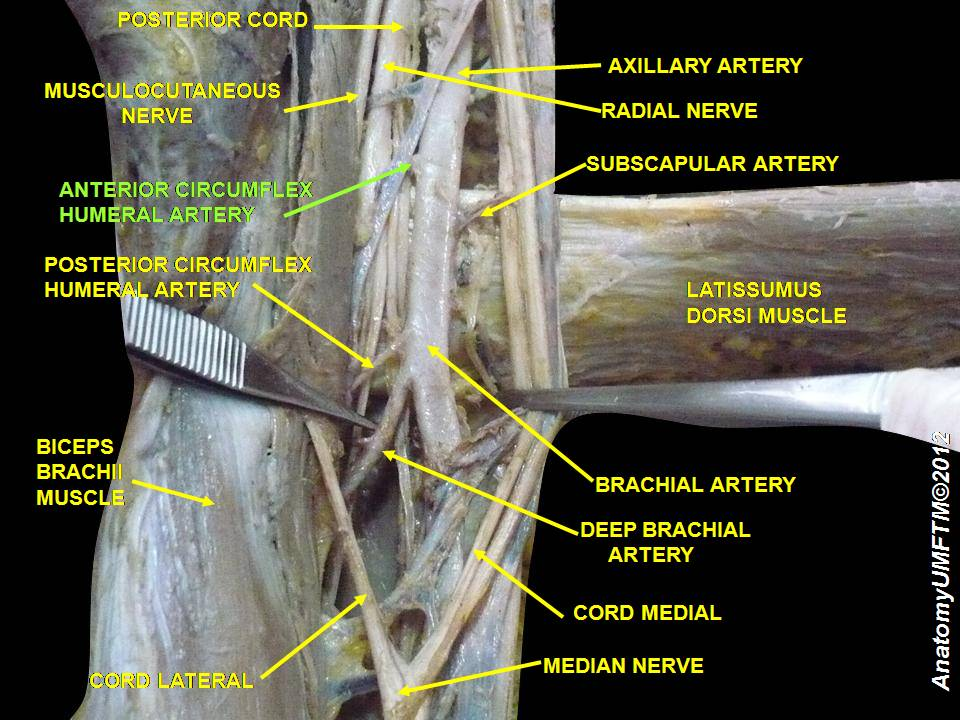
Anterior humeral circumflex artery

== See also ==
- Posterior humeral circumflex artery
