= Pectoralis minor =

Human chest muscle that protracts the shoulder

- Pectoralis minor (shown in red).

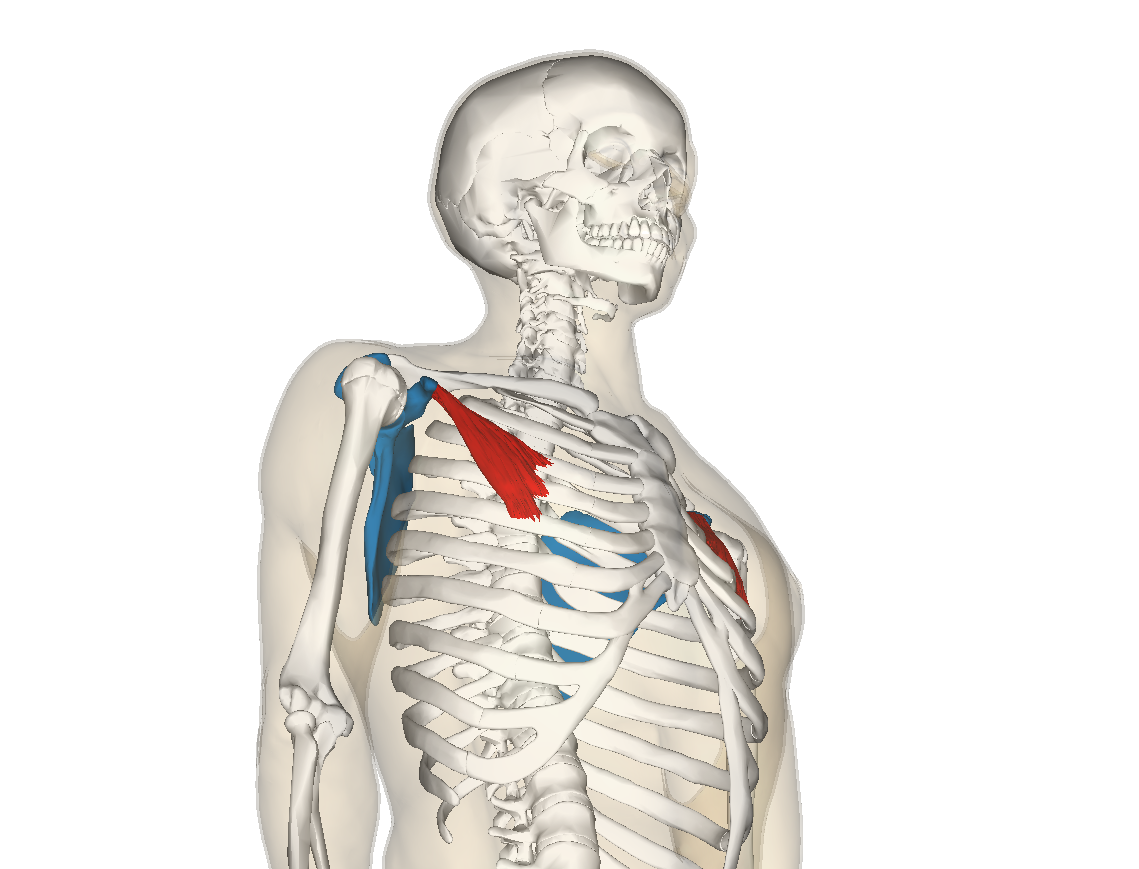
- Pectoralis minor muscle (shown in red). The bone shown in blue is the shoulder blade.

Details
- Origin: Third to fifth ribs, near the costochondral junction
- Insertion: Medial border and superior surface of the coracoid process of the scapula
- Artery: Pectoral branch of the thoracoacromial trunk
- Nerve: Medial pectoral nerve (C8)
- Actions: Stabilizes the scapula by drawing it inferiorly and anteriorly against the thoracic wall, raises ribs in inhalation

Identifiers
- Latin: musculus pectoralis minor
- TA98: A04.4.01.006
- TA2: 2305
- FMA: 13109

Pectoralis minor muscle (/ˌpɛktəˈrælɪs ˈmaɪnər/) is a thin, triangular muscle, situated at the upper part of the chest, beneath the pectoralis major in the human body. It arises from ribs III-V; it inserts onto the coracoid process of the scapula. It is innervated by the medial pectoral nerve. Its function is to stabilise the scapula by holding it fast in position against the chest wall.

== Structure ==
=== Attachments ===
From the muscle's origin, the muscle's fibers pass superiorly and laterally, converging to form a flat tendon.

==== Origin ====
Pectoralis minor muscle arises from the upper margins and outer surfaces of the 3rd, 4th, and 5th ribs near their costal cartilages, and from the aponeuroses covering the intercostalis.

==== Insertion ====
Its tendon inserts onto the medial border and upper surface of the coracoid process of the scapula.

=== Innervation ===
The muscle receives motor innervation from the medial pectoral nerve.

=== Relations ===
Pectoralis minor muscle forms part of the anterior wall of the axilla. It is covered anteriorly (superficially) by the clavipectoral fascia. The medial pectoral nerve pierces the pectoralis minor and the clavipectoral fascia. In attaching to the coracoid process, the pectoralis minor forms a 'bridge' - structures passing into the upper limb from the thorax will pass directly underneath.

Axillary nodes are classified according to their positions relative to the pectoralis minor muscle. Level 1 are lateral, Level 2 are deep, Level 3 are medial. The pectoralis minor divides the axillary artery into three parts (in contrary sequence compared to the nodes) - first part medial, second part deep/posterior, third part lateral in relation to the pectoralis minor.

=== Variations ===
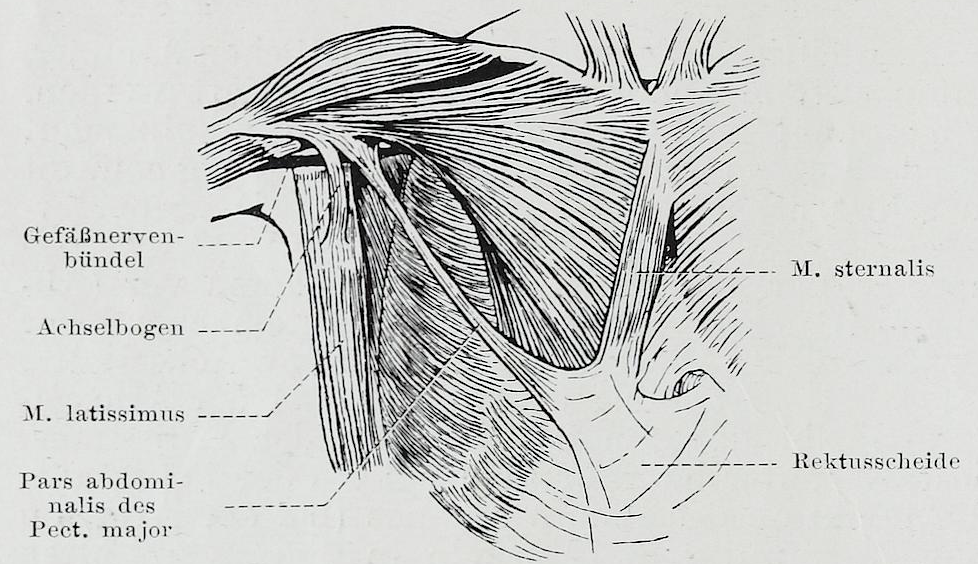
An individual with an axillary arch as well as sternalis muscle and an accessory abdominal portion of the pectoralis major.

The origin is from the second, third and fourth or fifth ribs. The tendon of insertion may extend over the coracoid process to the greater tubercle. It may be split into several parts. Absence of this muscle is rare but happens with certain uncommon diseases, such as the Poland syndrome.

== Function ==
Pectoralis minor muscle depresses the point of the shoulder, drawing the scapula superior, towards the thorax, and throwing its inferior angle posteriorly.

== Additional images ==
Position of pectoralis minor muscle (shown in red).

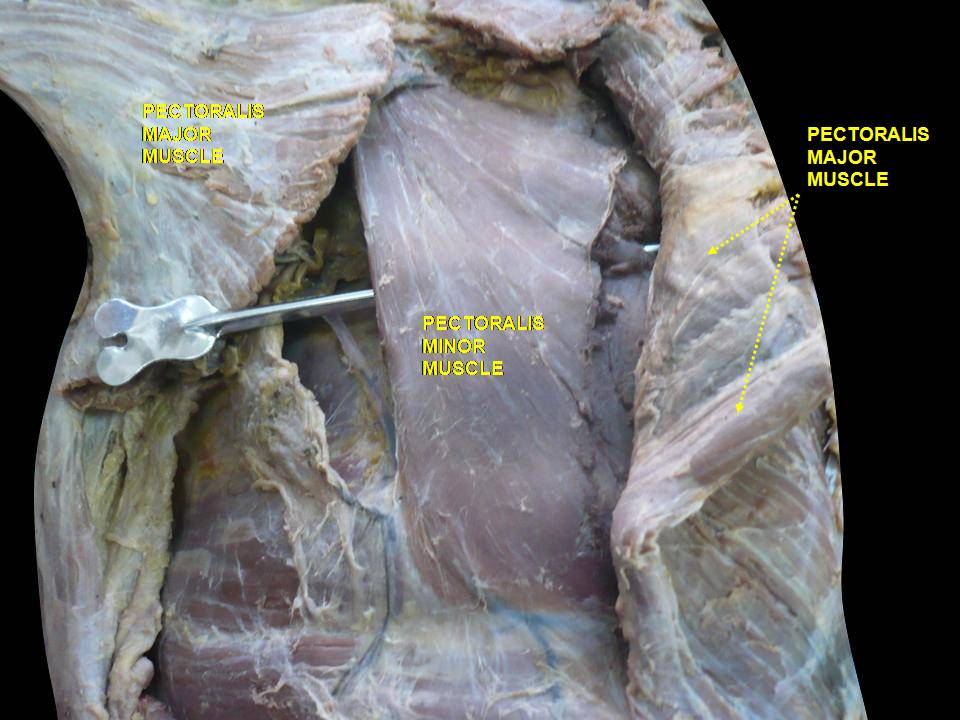
Right pectoralis minor muscle. Deep dissection.

== See also ==
- Pectoralis minor syndrome
