= Shoulder problems =

- Diagram of the human shoulder joint
- Specialty: Orthopedic surgery

Shoulder problems, including pain, are some of the more common reasons for physician visits for musculoskeletal symptoms. The shoulder is the most movable joint in the body. However, it is an unstable joint because of the range of motion allowed. This instability increases the likelihood of joint injury, often leading to a degenerative process in which tissues break down and no longer function well.

Shoulder pain may be localized or may be referred to areas around the shoulder or down the arm. Other regions within the body (such as gallbladder, liver, or heart disease, or disease of the cervical spine of the neck) also may generate pain that the brain may interpret as arising from the shoulder.

== Shoulder structures and functions ==
The shoulder joint is composed of three bones: the clavicle (collarbone), the scapula (shoulder blade), and the humerus (upper arm bone) (see diagram). Two joints facilitate shoulder movement. The acromioclavicular (AC) joint is located between the acromion (part of the scapula that forms the highest point of the shoulder) and the clavicle. The glenohumeral joint, to which the term "shoulder joint" commonly refers, is a ball-and-socket joint that allows the arm to rotate in a circular fashion or to hinge out and up away from the body. The "ball" is the top, rounded portion of the upper arm bone or humerus; the "socket," or glenoid, is a dish-shaped part of the outer edge of the scapula into which the ball fits. Arm movement is further facilitated by the ability of the scapula itself to slide along the rib cage. The capsule is a soft tissue envelope that encircles the glenohumeral joint. It is lined by a thin, smooth synovial membrane.

The bones of the shoulder are held in place by muscles, tendons, and ligaments. Tendons are tough cords of tissue that attach the shoulder muscles to bone and assist the muscles in moving the shoulder. Ligaments attach shoulder bones to each other, providing stability. For example, the front of the joint capsule is anchored by three glenohumeral ligaments.

The rotator cuff is a structure composed of tendons that, with associated muscles, holds the ball at the top of the humerus in the glenoid socket and provides mobility and strength to the shoulder joint.

Four filmy sac-like structures called bursa permit smooth gliding between bone, muscle, and tendon. They cushion and protect the rotator cuff from the bony arch of the acromion.

Mechanisms of Injury

Injuries to the rotator cuff can present in many different ways, it could involve damage to one or multiple of the rotator cuff muscles. These muscles are the supraspinatus, infraspinatus, teres minor, and the subscapularis. The acronym S.I.T.S can be used to remember each muscle of the rotator cuff. These muscles help to stabilize the glenohumeral joint as well as movement of the humerus in space. The supraspinatus is the most commonly injured RC muscle. The supraspinatus is responsible for assisting in abduction of the shoulder joint, it can be damaged in repetitive overhead motions, subacromial impingement, or falling on outstretched arms. The infraspinatus is an external rotator of the humerus and often injured through overhead throwing motions and eccentric deceleration of the arm after a throwing motion. The teres minor is another external rotator, though it is less commonly injured than the infraspinatus it is stressed due to excessive external rotation of the humerus which is common in overhead throwing athletes. The subscapularis is an internal rotator of the humerus, it can be injured in forced external rotation due to overstretching of the muscle. The degree of severity varies greatly in rotator cuff injuries, it can range from instability to mild tendonitis to full tears requiring surgical intervention.

== Diagnosis ==
Following are some of the ways doctors diagnose shoulder problems:

=== Medical history and physical exam ===
- Medical history (the patient tells the doctor about an injury). For shoulder problems the medical history includes the patient's age, dominant hand, if injury affects normal work/activities as well as details on the actual shoulder problem including acute versus chronic and the presence of shoulder catching, instability, locking, pain, paresthesias (burning sensation), stiffness, swelling, and weakness. Other salutary information includes OPQRST (onset, palliation/provocation, quality, radiation, severity, timing) and a history of issues that could lead to referred pain (pain felt at the shoulder but actually coming from another part of the body) including cervical spine disorders, heart attacks, peptic ulcer disease, and pneumonia. Standardized questionnaires like the Penn Shoulder Score that assess shoulder pain and function can aid in eliciting the required history to make a diagnosis and monitor condition progression.
- Physical examination of the shoulder to feel for injury and discover the limits of movement, location of pain, and extent of joint instability. The steps to elicit this information are inspection (looking), palpation (feeling), testing range of motion, and performing special maneuvers. Information collected on inspection are asymmetry, atrophy, ecchymosis, scars, swelling, and venous distention. Palpation can help find pain and deformities, and should specifically include the anterior glenohumeral joint, acromioclavicular joint, biceps tendon, cervical spine, coracoid process, scapula, and sternoclavicular joint. Range of motion tests external and internal rotation, abduction and adduction, passive and active weakness, and true weakness versus weakness due to pain. The Apley scratch test is the most useful: touch opposite scapular by reaching behind the head for adduction and external rotation and behind the back for abduction and internal rotation. Finally, there are more specific maneuvers that can home in on a diagnosis, however their accuracy is limited. Evidence suggests that recovery of shoulder function is not solely dependent on structural healing but heavily relies on restoring range of motion, strength, and coordinated motor control through rehabilitation. Emerging approaches, such as virtual reality–based therapy, have been shown to enhance patient engagement and may improve specific outcomes like shoulder abduction range of motion, while achieving comparable improvements in pain and overall function to traditional therapy.

=== Diagnostic tests ===
- Tests to confirm the diagnosis of certain conditions. Some of these tests include:
  - X-ray
  - Arthrogram—Diagnostic record that can be seen on an X-ray after injection of a contrast fluid into the shoulder joint to outline structures such as the rotator cuff. In disease or injury, this contrast fluid may either leak into an area where it does not belong, indicating a tear or opening, or be blocked from entering an area where there normally is an opening.
  - MRI (magnetic resonance imaging)--A non-invasive procedure in which a machine produces a series of cross-sectional images of the shoulder.
  - Other diagnostic tests, such as injection of an anesthetic into and around the shoulder joint.

== Dislocation ==
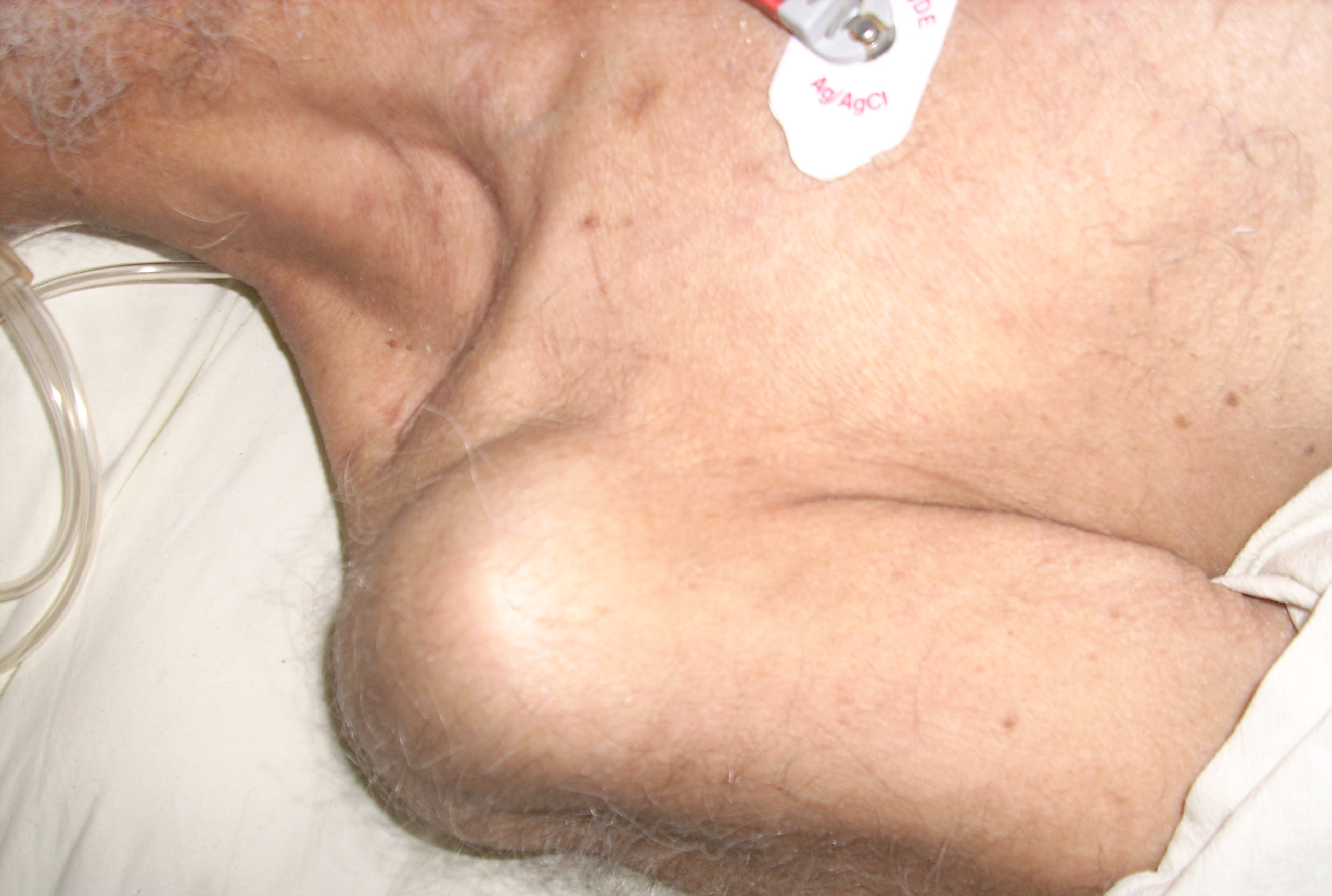
Anterior shoulder dislocation while carrying a frail elder

A dislocated shoulder is a condition in which the head of the humerus is detached from the glenoid fossa. The shoulder is the most commonly dislocated joint in the human body, comprising 50% of all joint dislocations. Symptoms include shoulder pain and instability.

There are multiple types of shoulder dislocation, with anterior dislocation being by far the most common, comprising 97% of all shoulder dislocations. Less common types includes posterior (2-4% of all shoulder dislocations) and inferior shoulder dislocation (<1% of all shoulder dislocations), as these latter types tend to involve a traumatic accident and/or impact. Shoulder dislocations can also be divided into subluxation (partial dislocation) or full dislocation.

== Separation ==
A separated shoulder, also known as acromioclavicular joint injury, is a common injury to the acromioclavicular joint. The AC joint is located at the outer end of the clavicle where it attaches to the acromion of the scapula. Symptoms include non-radiating pain which may make it difficult to move the shoulder. The presence of swelling or bruising and a deformity in the shoulder is also common depending on how severe the dislocation is.

It is most commonly due to a fall onto the front and upper part of the shoulder when the arm is by the side. They are classified as type I, II, III, IV, V, or VI with the higher the number the more severe the injury. Diagnosis is typically based on physical examination and X-rays. In type I and II injuries there is minimal deformity while in a type III injury the deformity resolves upon lifting the arm upwards. In type IV, V, and VI the deformity does not resolve with lifting the arm.

Generally types I and II are treated without surgery, while type III may be treated with or without surgery, and types IV, V, and VI are treated with surgery. For type I and II treatment is usually with a sling and pain medications for a week or two. In type III injuries surgery is generally only done if symptoms remain following treatment without surgery.

A separated shoulder is a common injury among those involved in sports, especially contact sports. It makes up about half of shoulder injuries among those who play hockey, football, and rugby. Those affected are typically 20 to 30 years old. Males are more often affected than females. The injury was initially classified in 1967 with the current classification from 1984.

== Sternoclavicular separation ==
=== Description ===
While not directly a shoulder problem, this may affect shoulder functionality due to problems with sternoclavicular rotation. A sternoclavicular separation occurs when the sternum separates from the clavicle at the sternoclavicular joint. Sternoclavicular separations (dislocation and subluxation) are rare and generally caused by accident. If the clavicle is separated posteriorly (i.e. the clavicle separates and goes behind the sternum) the situation can be dangerous and the clavicle can cause damage to interior arteries, veins or organs.

=== Signs and diagnosis ===
An X-ray or CT Scan may be necessary to accurately diagnose a sternoclavicular separation.

=== Treatment ===
Treatment consists of the standard use of plenty of rest, icing, NSAIDs and a sling. The joint may need to be reduced (i.e. put back in place), especially after posterior separations. In severe cases, surgery may be advised.

== Rotator cuff tendinopathy (tendinitis, bursitis, impingement syndrome, and rotator cuff tears) ==
=== Anatomy ===
The "rotator cuff" is a group of four tendons that blend together as they attach to the upper end of the arm bone (humerus). These tendons transmit the force of muscles originating on the shoulder blade (scapula) to the arm providing rotational motion and centering or stability of the joint.

=== Pathology ===
The rotator cuff tendons degenerate with age. A 2013 literature review of evidence suggested the Hypothesis that degeneration is related to pinching (or impingement) between the head of the humerus and the acromion is not the cause. Rotator cuff pathology is similar in non-dominant compared to dominant and symptomatic compared to asymptomatic shoulder. About two-thirds of all humans develop rotator cuff tendinopathy if they live to 70 years of age. The pathology is mucoid degeneration, not inflammation. The process can involve the intra-articular part of the long head of biceps in addition to the supraspinatus, infraspinatus, and subscapularis tendons.

Tendinitis is inflammation (redness, soreness, and swelling) of a tendon. In tendinitis of the shoulder, the rotator cuff and/or biceps tendon become inflamed, usually as a result of being pinched by surrounding structures. The injury may vary from mild inflammation to involvement of most of the rotator cuff. When the rotator cuff tendon becomes inflamed and thickened, it may get trapped under the acromion. Squeezing of the rotator cuff is called impingement syndrome.

==== Subacromial bursitis ====
Subacromial bursitis is a condition caused by inflammation of the bursa that separates the superior surface of the supraspinatus tendon (one of the four tendons of the rotator cuff) from the overlying coraco-acromial ligament, acromion, and coracoid (the acromial arch) and from the deep surface of the deltoid muscle. The subacromial bursa helps the motion of the supraspinatus tendon of the rotator cuff in activities such as overhead work.

Musculoskeletal complaints are one of the most common reasons for primary care office visits, and rotator cuff disorders are the most common source of shoulder pain.

Primary inflammation of the subacromial bursa is relatively rare and may arise from autoimmune inflammatory conditions such as rheumatoid arthritis, crystal deposition disorders such as gout or pseudogout, calcific loose bodies, and infection. More commonly, subacromial bursitis arises as a result of complex factors, thought to cause shoulder impingement symptoms. These factors are broadly classified as intrinsic (intratendinous) or extrinsic (extratendinous). They are further divided into primary or secondary causes of impingement. Secondary causes are thought to be part of another process such as shoulder instability or nerve injury.

In 1983 Neer described three stages of impingement syndrome. He noted that "the symptoms and physical signs in all three stages of impingement are almost identical, including the 'impingement sign'..., arc of pain, crepitus, and varying weakness". The Neer classification did not distinguish between partial-thickness and full-thickness rotator cuff tears in stage III. This has led to some controversy about the ability of physical examination tests to accurately diagnose between bursitis, impingement, impingement with or without rotator cuff tear and impingement with partial versus complete tears.

In 2005, Park et al. published their findings which concluded that a combination of clinical tests were more useful than a single physical examination test. For the diagnosis of impingement disease, the best combination of tests were "any degree (of) a positive Hawkins–Kennedy test, a positive painful arc sign, and weakness in external rotation with the arm at the side", to diagnose a full thickness rotator cuff tear, the best combination of tests, when all three are positive, were the painful arc, the drop-arm sign, and weakness in external rotation.

==== Rotator cuff tear ====
Rotator cuff tendinopathy (or rotator cuff tear) is an injury or rupture of the rotator cuff tendons, usually involving more than one shoulder muscle. Rotator cuff tendinopathy is common during aging.

Rotator cuff tendinopathy is, by far, the most common reason people seek care for shoulder pain. Pain related to rotator cuff tendinopathy is typically on the front side of the shoulder, down to the elbow, and worse reaching up or back. Diagnosis is based on symptoms and examination. Medical imaging is used mostly to plan surgery and is not needed for diagnosis.

Treatment may include pain medication, such as NSAIDs and specific exercises. It is recommended that people who are unable to raise their arm above 90 degrees after two weeks should be further assessed. Surgery may be offered for acute ruptures and large attritional defects with good quality muscle. The benefits of surgery for smaller defects are unclear as of 2019. A 2025 study concluded that arthroscopic subacromial decompression offered no benefit after ten years of follow-up over placebo surgery (diagnostic arthroscopy) or exercise in people with symptoms consistent with subacromial pain syndrome for more than three months.

=== Signs ===
Signs of these conditions include the slow onset of discomfort and pain in the upper shoulder or upper third of the arm and/or difficulty sleeping on the shoulder, similar condition can have sharp pain or discomfort when the upper shoulder is positioned at certain angles. Tendinitis and bursitis also cause pain when the arm is lifted away from the body or overhead. If tendinitis involves the biceps tendon (the tendon located in front of the shoulder that helps bend the elbow and turn the forearm), pain will occur in the front or side of the shoulder and may travel down to the elbow and forearm. Pain may also occur when the arm is forcefully pushed upward overhead.

=== Diagnosis ===
Diagnosis of tendinitis and bursitis begins with a medical history and physical examination. X-rays do not show tendons or the bursae but may be helpful in ruling out bony abnormalities or arthritis. The doctor may remove and test fluid from the inflamed area to rule out infection. Ultrasound scans are frequently used to confirm a suspected tendinitis or bursitis as well as rule out a tear in the rotator cuff muscles. Impingement syndrome may be confirmed when injection of a small amount of anesthetic (lidocaine hydrochloride) into the space under the acromion relieves pain.

=== Treatment ===
Anti-inflammatory medicines such as aspirin, naproxen or ibuprofen among others can be taken to help with pain. In some cases the physical therapist will use ultrasound and electrical stimulation, as well as manipulation. Gentle stretching and strengthening exercises are added gradually. If there is no improvement, the doctor may inject a corticosteroid medicine into the space under the acromion. However, recent level one evidence showed limited efficacy of corticosteroid injections for pain relief. While steroid injections are a common treatment, they must be used with caution because they may lead to tendon rupture. If there is still no improvement after six to 12 months, the doctor may perform either arthroscopic or open surgery to repair damage and relieve pressure on the tendons and bursae.

In those with calcific tendinitis of the shoulder high energy extracorporeal shock-wave therapy can be useful. It is not useful in other types of tendonitis. For a rotator cuff tear, tentative evidence suggests exercise may reduce pain in the short-term. Combination of exercise and joint mobilization can result in long term benefits. Other evidence demonstrates the use of corticosteroids injections to be more effective.

== SLAP tear (lesion) ==
A SLAP tear or SLAP lesion is an injury to the superior glenoid labrum (fibrocartilaginous rim attached around the margin of the glenoid cavity in the shoulder blade) that initiates in the back of the labrum and stretches toward the front into the attachment point of the long head of the biceps tendon. SLAP is an acronym for "Superior Labrum Anterior and Posterior". SLAP lesions are commonly seen in overhead throwing athletes but middle-aged labor workers can also be affected, and they can be caused by chronic overuse or an acute stretch injury of the shoulder.

== Frozen shoulder (adhesive capsulitis) ==
Adhesive capsulitis, also known as "frozen shoulder," is a condition characterized by shoulder pain and stiffness. Onset is gradual over weeks to months. A common shoulder ailment, adhesive capsulitis is marked by pain at rest but especially upon movement, as well as a decrease in passive range of motion (particularly in external rotation). The shoulder often does not hurt when touched (non-tender).

The exact cause in most cases is unknown. Post-traumatic stiffness after injury or surgery to the shoulder is best considered separately from adhesive capsulitis, which is idiopathic, meaning there are no known causes. The underlying mechanism is believed to involve inflammation and scarring within the shoulder joint capsule, but the cause is unknown.

Diagnosis is generally based on a person's symptoms and a physical exam. A key feature that can distinguish adhesive capsulitis from similar conditions is the inability of others to move the shoulder, in addition to the loss of voluntary movement (a loss of both active and passive ranges of motion). This is in contrast to most muscle, tendon, and nerve disorders, where only the active range of motion is limited. Radiographs can exclude glenohumeral arthritis as the source of the loss of passive motion. Imaging is otherwise not used for diagnosis or evaluation. The role of MRI or ultrasound is debatable.

The condition can sometimes resolve itself over time without intervention, but this may take several years, and results are better when it is treated. There are a number of non-procedural treatments, including nonsteroidal anti-inflammatory drugs, physical therapy, and oral or injected steroids. Surgery is an option for those who do not improve after other treatments. Additional methods of treatment include nerve block, high pressure saline injection, plasma injection, and extracorporeal shockwave therapy.

Frozen shoulder is most common in people 40–60 years of age. It is also significantly more common in women. Major risk factors include diabetes and thyroid disease. Approximately 2-5% of people have adhesive capsulitis at any given time.

== Shoulder Fractures ==
=== Clavicle fracture ===
A clavicle fracture, also known as a broken collarbone, is a partial or complete break of the clavicle bone. Symptoms typically include pain and tenderness at the site of the break and a decreased ability to move the affected arm. Other symptoms may also include reports of a cracking sensation during the injury, swelling, and deformity over the injury site. Complications can include a collection of air in the pleural space surrounding the lung (pneumothorax), injury to the nerves or blood vessels in the area, and an unpleasant appearance.

It is most often caused by a fall directly onto a shoulder, direct trauma to the bone, or a fall onto an outstretched arm. The fracture can also occur in a baby during childbirth. Rare causes of clavicle fractures include muscle contractions during seizures and minimal trauma in the setting of pathologic bone conditions. The middle section of the clavicle is most often involved. Diagnosis is typically based on symptoms and trauma then confirmed with X-rays.

Clavicle fractures can be treated operatively or non-operatively. Operative treatment involves alignment and stabilization of the fracture with plates and screws or an intramedullary device. Non-operative treatment consists of immobilization by putting the arm in a standard sling for three to four weeks. Pain medication such as paracetamol (acetaminophen) may be useful. It can take up to five months for the strength of the bone to return to normal. Reasons for surgical repair include an open fracture, involvement of the nerves or blood vessels, tenting of the skin, or severe displacement in a high-demand individual

Clavicle fractures most commonly occur in people under the age of 25 and those over the age of 70. Among the younger group males are more often affected than females. In adults they make up about 5% of all fractures while in children they represent about 13% of fractures.

=== Scapular fracture ===
A scapular fracture is a fracture of the scapula, the shoulder blade. The scapula is sturdy and located in a protected place, so it rarely breaks. When it does, it is an indication that the individual was subjected to a considerable amount of force and that severe chest trauma may be present. High-speed vehicle accidents are the most common cause. This could be anywhere from a car accident, motorcycle crash, or high speed bicycle crash but falls and blows to the area can also be responsible for the injury. Signs and symptoms are similar to those of other fractures: they include pain, tenderness, and reduced motion of the affected area although symptoms can take a couple of days to appear. Imaging techniques such as X-ray are used to diagnose scapular fracture, but the injury may not be noticed in part because it is so frequently accompanied by other, severe injuries that demand attention. The injuries that usually accompany scapular fracture generally have the greatest impact on the patient's outcome. However, the injury can also occur by itself; when it does, it does not present a significant threat to life. Treatment involves pain control and immobilizing the affected area, and, later, physical therapy.

=== Proximal humerus fracture ===
A proximal humerus fracture is a break of the upper part of the bone of the arm (humerus). Symptoms include pain, swelling, and a decreased ability to move the shoulder. Complications may include axillary nerve or axillary artery injury.

The cause is generally a fall onto the arm or direct trauma to the arm. Risk factors include osteoporosis and diabetes. Diagnosis is generally based on X-rays or CT scan. It is a type of humerus fracture. A number of classification systems exist.

Treatment is generally with an arm sling for a brief period of time followed by specific exercises. This appears appropriate in many cases even when the fragments are separated. Less commonly surgery is recommended.

Proximal humerus fractures are common. Older people are most commonly affected. In this age group they are the third most common fractures after hip and Colles fractures. Women are more often affected than men.

== Arthritis of the shoulder (glenohumeral joint) ==
=== Description ===
In arthritis of the shoulder, the cartilage of the ball and socket (glenohumeral joint) is lost so that bone rubs on bone. It may be caused by wear and tear (degenerative joint disease), injury (traumatic arthritis), surgery (secondary degenerative joint disease), inflammation (rheumatoid arthritis) or infection (septic arthritis).

=== Signs and diagnosis ===
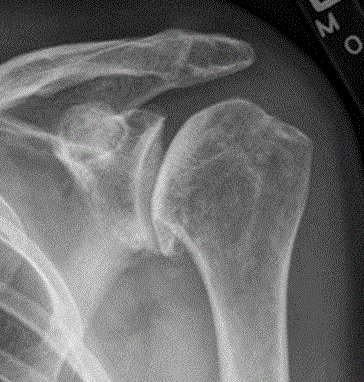
X-ray of shoulder osteoarthritis.

Arthritis of the shoulder causes pain and loss of motion and use of the shoulder. X-rays of the shoulder show loss of the normal space between the ball and socket. X-ray can provide radiographic staging of shoulder osteoarthritis.

=== Treatment ===
Early on arthritis of the shoulder can be managed with mild analgesics and gentle exercises. Known gentle exercises include warm water therapy pool exercises that are provided by a trained and licensed physical therapist; approved land exercises to assure free movement of the arthritic area; cortisone injections (administered at the minimum of every six months according to orthopedic physicians) to reduce inflammation; ice and hot moist pact application are very effective. Moist heat is preferred over ice whereas ice is preferred if inflammation occurs during the daytime hours. Local analgesics along with ice or moist heat are adequate treatments for acute pain.

In the case of rheumatoid arthritis, specific medications selected by a rheumatologist may offer substantial relief.

When exercise and medication are no longer effective, shoulder replacement surgery for arthritis may be considered. In this operation, a surgeon replaces the shoulder joint with an artificial ball for the top of the humerus and a cap (glenoid) for the scapula. Passive shoulder exercises (where someone else moves the arm to rotate the shoulder joint) are started soon after surgery. Patients begin exercising on their own about three to six weeks after surgery. Eventually, stretching and strengthening exercises become a major part of the rehabilitation programme. The success of the operation often depends on the condition of rotator cuff muscles prior to surgery and the degree to which the patient follows the exercise programme.

In young and active patients a partial shoulder replacement with a non-prosthetic glenoid arthroplasty may also be a consideration

== Arthritis or osteolysis of the AC (acromioclavicular) joint ==
=== Description ===
The acromioclavicular articulation consists of the acromioclavicular ligament and a small disk of cartilage located in between the acromion and the clavicle. This disk can wear down through injury, extreme joint stress (via bodybuilding) or normal wear.

=== Signs and diagnosis ===
Pain is perceived on shoulder motion, especially on certain movements. Often a crossover arm test is utilized in diagnosis because this compresses the AC joint, exacerbating the symptoms. X-rays of the shoulder joint may show either arthritic changes of the ac joint or osteolysis.

=== Treatment ===
Conservative treatment for this joint is similar to treatments for other types of arthritis, including restricting activity, anti-inflammatory medications (or supplements), physical therapy, and occasionally cortisone shots. If the pain is severe, surgery may be an option. The most common surgical treatment, known as resection arthroplasty, involves cutting a very small portion off the clavicle end and letting scar tissue fill in its place. Some portions of the acromioclavicular ligament may still remain attached.

== Treatment ==
A mnemonic for the basic treatment principles of any musculoskeletal problems is PRICE: Protection, Rest, Ice, Compression, and Elevation:

- Protection: Guard the shoulder to prevent further injury.
- Rest: Reduce or stop using the injured area for 48 hours.
- Ice: Put an ice pack on the injured area for 20 minutes at a time, 4 to 8 times per day. Use a cold pack, ice bag, or a plastic bag filled with crushed ice that has been wrapped in a towel.
- Compression: Compress the area with bandages, such as an elastic wrap, to help stabilize the shoulder.
- Elevation: Keep the injured area elevated above the level of the heart. Use a pillow to help elevate the injury.

If pain and stiffness persist, see a doctor.

According to the American Academy of Orthopaedic Surgeons (AAOS) visits to orthopedic specialists for shoulder pain has been rising since 1998 and in 2005 over 13 million patients sought medical care for shoulder pain, of which only 34 percent were related to injury.
