= Rotator cuff =

Group of muscles

Details
- Artery: Suprascapular artery, circumflex scapular artery
- Nerve: Subscapular nerve, suprascapular nerve, axillary nerve
- Lymph: Axillary lymph nodes

Identifiers
- Latin: musculi cuffiae musculotendineae
- Acronym: SITS muscle
- MeSH: D017006
- TA2: 2461
- FMA: 37018

Right shoulder joint. Posterior view at left. Anterior view at right. 1. Clavicle, 2. Scapula (with 3. Scapular spine, 4. Coracoid process, 5. Acromion), 6. Humerus; Joints: 7. Acromioclavicular (AC), 8. Glenohumeral; 9: Bursa; 10. Rotator cuff (with 11. Supraspinatus, 12. Subscapularis, 13. Infraspinatus, 14. Teres minor), 15. Biceps muscle

The rotator cuff (SITS muscles) is a group of muscles and their tendons that act to stabilize the human shoulder and allow for its extensive range of motion. Of the seven scapulohumeral muscles, four make up the rotator cuff. The four muscles are:

- supraspinatus muscle
- infraspinatus muscle
- teres minor muscle
- subscapularis muscle

== Structure ==
=== Muscles composing rotator cuff ===
Muscle	Origin on scapula	Attachment on humerus	Function	Innervation
Supraspinatus muscle	supraspinous fossa	superior facet of the greater tubercle	abducts the humerus	Suprascapular nerve (C5)
Infraspinatus muscle	infraspinous fossa	middle facet of the greater tubercle	externally rotates the humerus	Suprascapular nerve (C5–C6)
Teres minor muscle	middle half of lateral border	inferior facet of the greater tubercle	externally rotates the humerus	Axillary nerve (C5)
Subscapularis muscle	subscapular fossa	lesser tubercle	internally rotates the humerus	Upper and Lower subscapular nerve (C5–C6)

The supraspinatus muscle spreads out in a horizontal band to insert on the superior facet of the greater tubercle of the humerus. The greater tubercle projects as the most lateral structure of the humeral head. Medial to this, in turn, is the lesser tubercle of the humeral head. The subscapularis muscle origin is divided from the remainder of the rotator cuff origins as it is deep to the scapula.

The four tendons of these muscles converge to form the rotator cuff tendon. These tendinous insertions along with the articular capsule, the coracohumeral ligament, and the glenohumeral ligament complex, blend into a confluent sheet before insertion into the humeral tuberosities (i.e. greater and lesser tubercle). The infraspinatus and teres minor fuse near their musculotendinous junctions, while the supraspinatus and subscapularis tendons join as a sheath that surrounds the biceps tendon at the entrance of the bicipital groove. The supraspinatus is most commonly involved in a rotator cuff tear.

== Function ==
The rotator cuff muscles are important in shoulder movements and in maintaining glenohumeral joint (shoulder joint) stability. These muscles arise from the scapula and connect to the head of the humerus, forming a cuff at the shoulder joint (hence the name rotator cuff). They hold the head of the humerus in the small and shallow glenoid fossa of the scapula. The glenohumeral joint has been analogously described as a golf ball (head of the humerus) sitting on a golf tee (glenoid fossa).

The rotator cuff compresses the glenohumeral joint during abduction of the arm, an action known as concavity compression, in order to allow the large deltoid muscle to further elevate the arm. In other words, without the rotator cuff, the humeral head would ride up partially out of the glenoid fossa, lessening the efficiency of the deltoid muscle. The anterior and posterior directions of the glenoid fossa are more susceptible to shear force perturbations, as the glenoid fossa is not as deep relative to the superior and inferior directions. The rotator cuff's contributions to concavity compression and stability vary according to their stiffness and the direction of the force they apply upon the joint.

In addition to stabilizing the glenohumeral joint and controlling humeral head translation, the rotator cuff muscles also perform multiple functions, including abduction, internal rotation, and external rotation of the shoulder. The infraspinatus and subscapularis have significant roles in scapular plane shoulder abduction (scaption), generating forces that are two to three times greater than the force produced by the supraspinatus muscle. However, the supraspinatus is more effective for general shoulder abduction because of its moment arm. The anterior portion of the supraspinatus tendon is submitted to a significantly greater load and stress, and performs its main functional role.

== Clinical significance ==
=== Tear ===
The tendons at the ends of the rotator cuff muscles can become torn, leading to pain and restricted movement of the arm. A torn rotator cuff can occur following trauma to the shoulder or it can occur through the "wear and tear" on tendons, most commonly the supraspinatus tendon found under the acromion.

Rotator cuff injuries are commonly associated with motions that require repeated overhead motions or forceful pulling motions. Such injuries are frequently sustained by athletes whose actions include making repetitive throws, athletes such as handball players, baseball pitchers, softball pitchers, American football players (especially quarterbacks), firefighters, cheerleaders, weightlifters (especially powerlifters due to extreme weights used in the bench press), rugby players, volleyball players (due to their swinging motions), water polo players, rodeo team ropers, shot put throwers, swimmers, boxers, kayakers, martial artists, fast bowlers in cricket, tennis players (due to their service motion) and tenpin bowlers due to the repetitive swinging motion of the arm with the weight of a bowling ball. This type of injury also commonly affects orchestra conductors, choral conductors, and drummers (due, again, to swinging motions).

As progression increases after 4–6 weeks, active exercises are now implemented into the rehabilitation process. Active exercises allow an increase in strength and further range of motion by permitting the movement of the shoulder joint without the support of a physical therapist. Active exercises include the Pendulum exercise, which is used to strengthen the Supraspinatus, Infraspinatus, and Subscapularis. External rotation of the shoulder with the arm at a 90-degree angle is an additional exercise done to increase control and range of motion of the Infraspinatus and Teres minor muscles. Various active exercises are done for an additional 3–6 weeks as progress is based on an individual case-by-case basis. At 8–12 weeks, strength training intensity will increase as free-weights and resistance bands will be implemented within the exercise prescription.

=== Impingement ===
The accuracy of the physical examination is low. The Hawkins-Kennedy test has a sensitivity of approximately 80% to 90% for detecting impingement. The infraspinatus and supraspinatus tests have a specificity of 80% to 90%.

A common cause of shoulder pain in rotator cuff impingement syndrome is tendinosis, which is an age-related and most often self-limiting condition.

Studies show that there is moderate evidence that hypothermia (cold therapy) and exercise therapy used together are more effective than simply waiting for surgery and they suggest the best outcome for non-surgical treatment of subacromial impingement syndrome. The group of patients who participated in the exercise group were found to use significantly lower amounts of non-steroidal anti-inflammatory drugs (NSAIDS) and analgesics than the control group with no intervention.

=== Inflammation and fibrosis ===
The rotator interval is a triangular space in the shoulder that is functionally reinforced externally by the coracohumeral ligament and internally by the superior glenohumeral ligament, and traversed by the intra-articular biceps tendon. On imaging, it is defined by the coracoid process at its base, the supraspinatus tendon superiorly and the subscapularis tendon inferiorly. Changes of adhesive capsulitis can be seen at this interval as edema and fibrosis. Pathology at the interval is also associated with glenohumeral and biceps instability. Adhesive capsulitis or "frozen shoulder" is often secondary to rotator cuff injury due to post-surgical immobilization. Available treatment options include intra-articular corticosteroid injections to relieve pain in the short-term and electrotherapy, mobilizations, and home exercise programs for long-term pain relief.

== Pain management ==
Treatment for a rotator cuff tear can include rest, ice, physical therapy, and/or surgery. A review of manual therapy and exercise treatments found inconclusive evidence as to whether these treatments were any better than placebo, however "High quality evidence from one trial suggested that manual therapy and exercise improved function only slightly more than placebo at 22 weeks, was little or no different to placebo in terms of other patient-important outcomes (e.g. overall pain), and was associated with relatively more frequent but mild adverse events."

The rotator cuff includes muscles such as the supraspinatus muscle, the infraspinatus muscle, the teres minor muscle and the subscapularis muscle. The upper arm consists of the deltoids, biceps, as well as the triceps. Steps must be taken and precautions need to be made in order for the rotator cuffs to heal properly following surgery while still maintaining function to prevent any deteriorating effects on the muscles. In the immediate postoperative period (within one week following surgery), pain can be treated with a standard ice wrap. There are also commercial devices available which not only cool the shoulder but also exert pressure on the shoulder ("compressive cryotherapy"). However, one study has shown no significant difference in postoperative pain when comparing these devices to a standard ice wrap.

=== Continuous passive motion ===
Physiotherapy can help manage the pain, but utilizing a program that involves continuous passive motion will reduce the pain even further. Assisted passive motion at a low intensity allows the tissues to be stretched slightly without damaging them Continuous passive motion improves the shoulder range and enables the subject to expand their range of motion without experiencing additional pain. Easing into the motions will allow the person to continue working those muscles to keep them from undergoing atrophy, while also still maintaining that minimum level of function where daily function is allowed. Doing these exercises will also prevent tears in the muscles that will impair daily function further.

=== Manual therapy ===
A systematic review and meta-analysis study shows manual therapy may help to reduce pain for patient with rotator cuff tendinopathy, based on low- to moderate-quality evidence. However, there is not strong evidence for improving function also.

=== Surgery ===
Surgical approaches include acromioplasty (a part of the bone is removed to decrease pressure placed on the rotator cuff tendons), removal of a bursa that is inflamed or swollen, and subacromial decompression (the removal of tissue or bone that is damaged in order to allow more space for the tendons).

Surgery may be recommended for patients with an acute, traumatic rotator cuff tear resulting in substantial weakness. Surgery can be performed open or arthroscopically, although the arthroscopic approach has become much more popular. If a surgical option is selected, the rehabilitation of the rotator cuff is necessary in order to regain maximum strength and range of motion within the shoulder joint. Physical therapy progresses through four stages, increasing movement throughout each phase. The tempo and intensity of the stages are solely reliant on the extent of the injury and the patient's activity necessities. The first stage requires immobilization of the shoulder joint. The shoulder that is injured is placed in a sling and shoulder flexion or abduction of the arm is avoided for 4 to 6 weeks after surgery (Brewster, 1993). Avoiding movement of the shoulder joint allows the torn tendon to fully heal. Once the tendon is entirely recovered, passive exercises can be implemented. Passive exercises of the shoulder are movements in which a physical therapist maintains the arm in a particular position, manipulating the rotator cuff without any effort by the patient. These exercises are used to increase stability, strength and range of motion of the subscapularis, supraspinatus, infraspinatus, and teres minor muscles within the rotator cuff. Passive exercises include internal and external rotation of the shoulder joint, as well as flexion and extension of the shoulder.

A 2019 Cochrane Systematic Review found with a high degree of certainty that subacromial decompression surgery does not improve pain, function, or quality of life compared with a placebo surgery.

=== Orthotherapy exercises ===
Patients who experience pain in the rotator cuff may consider utilizing orthotherapy into their daily lives. Orthotherapy is an exercise program that aims to restore the motion and strength of the shoulder muscles. Patients can go through the three phases of orthotherapy to help manage pain and also recover their full range of motion in the rotator cuff. The first phase involves gentle stretches and passive all around movements, and people are advised not to go above 70 degrees of elevation to prevent any kind of further pain. The second phase of this regimen requires patients to implement exercises to strengthen the muscles that are surrounding the rotator cuff muscles, combined with the passive exercises done in the first phase to keep on stretching the tissues without overexerting them. Exercises include pushups and shoulder shrugs, and after a couple of weeks of this, daily activities are gradually added to the patient's routine. This program does not require any sort of medication or surgery and can serve as a good alternative. The rotator cuff and the upper muscles are responsible for many daily tasks that people do in their lives. A proper recovery needs to be maintained and achieved to prevent limiting movement, and can be done through simple movements.

== Additional images ==
Human shoulder joint, front view

Human shoulder joint, back view

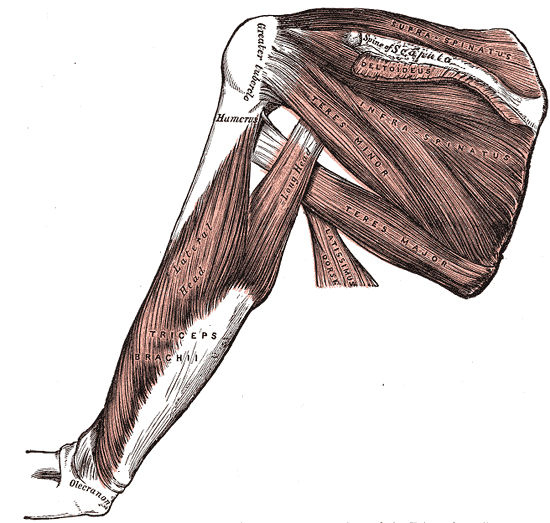
Muscles on the dorsum of the scapula, and the triceps brachii

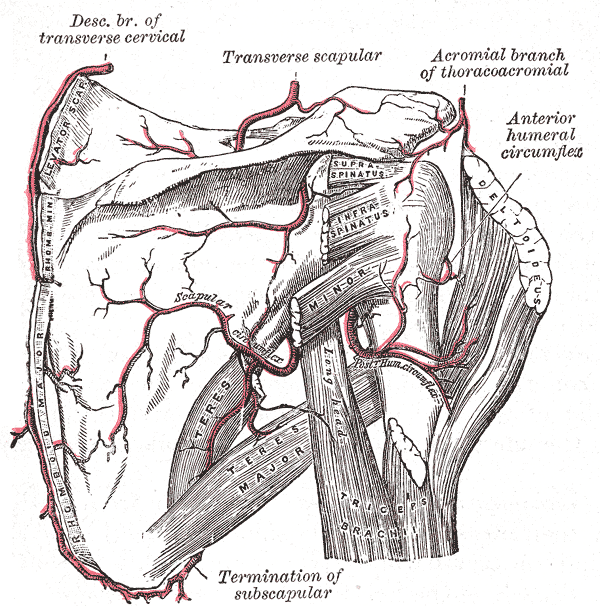
The scapular and circumflex arteries (posterior view)

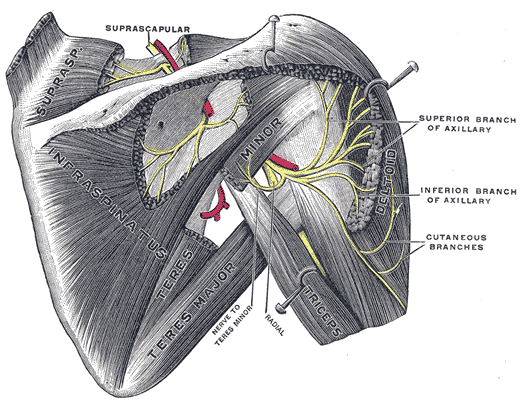
Suprascapular and axillary nerves of right side, seen from behind

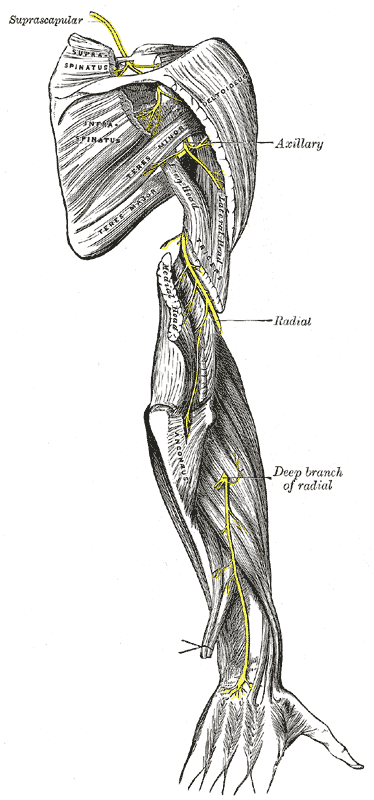
The suprascapular, axillary, and radial nerves

== See also ==
- Rotator cuff injury
- Shoulder impingement syndrome
