= Adhesive capsulitis of the shoulder =

Painful disease restricting movement

- Other names: Frozen shoulder
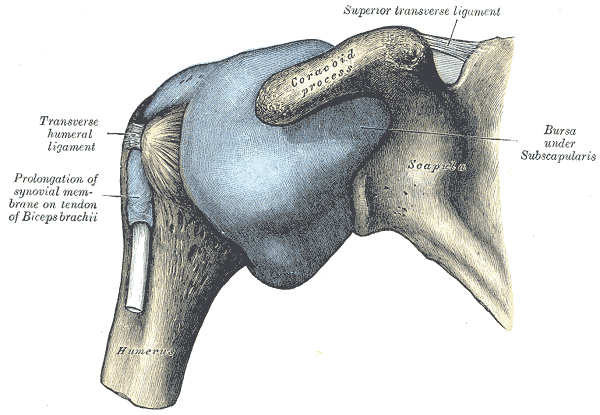
- The right shoulder and glenohumeral joint.
- Specialty: Orthopedics
- Symptoms: Shoulder pain, stiffness
- Usual onset: 40 to 60 year old
- Duration: May last years
- Types: Primary, secondary
- Causes: Often unknown, prior shoulder injury
- Risk factors: Diabetes, hypothyroidism
- Differential diagnosis: Pinched nerve, autoimmune disease, biceps tendinopathy, osteoarthritis, rotator cuff tear, cancer, bursitis
- Treatment: physical therapy, NSAIDs, oral steroids, steroid injection, nerve block, high pressure saline injection, plasma injection, extracorporeal shockwave therapy, manipulation under anesthesia, surgery
- Frequency: 2 to 5%

Adhesive capsulitis, also known as "frozen shoulder," is a condition characterized by shoulder pain and stiffness. Onset is gradual over weeks to months. A common shoulder ailment, adhesive capsulitis is marked by pain at rest but especially upon movement, as well as a decrease in passive range of motion (particularly in external rotation). The shoulder often does not hurt when touched (non-tender).

The exact cause in most cases is unknown. Post-traumatic stiffness after injury or surgery to the shoulder is best considered separately from adhesive capsulitis, which is idiopathic, meaning there are no known causes. The underlying mechanism is believed to involve inflammation and scarring within the shoulder joint capsule, but the cause is unknown.

Diagnosis is generally based on a person's symptoms and a physical exam. A key feature that can distinguish adhesive capsulitis from similar conditions is the inability of others to move the shoulder, in addition to the loss of voluntary movement (a loss of both active and passive ranges of motion). This is in contrast to most muscle, tendon, and nerve disorders, where only the active range of motion is limited. Radiographs can exclude glenohumeral arthritis as the source of the loss of passive motion. Imaging is otherwise not used for diagnosis or evaluation. The role of MRI or ultrasound is debatable.

The condition can sometimes resolve itself over time without intervention, but this may take several years, and results are better when it is treated. There are a number of non-procedural treatments, including nonsteroidal anti-inflammatory drugs, physical therapy, and oral or injected steroids. Surgery is an option for those who do not improve after other treatments. Additional methods of treatment include nerve block, high pressure saline injection, plasma injection, and extracorporeal shockwave therapy.

Frozen shoulder is most common in people 40–60 years of age. It is also significantly more common in women. Major risk factors include diabetes and thyroid disease. Approximately 2-5% of people have adhesive capsulitis at any given time.

== Signs and symptoms ==
Adhesive capsulitis presents with progressively worsening shoulder pain and limited range of motion. Pain due to frozen shoulder is usually dull or aching, and may be worse at night or when lying on the affected shoulder. Any movement, especially rapid or unguarded movement, can aggravate the pain.

Physical exam findings include restricted range of motion in all planes of movement (but especially in external rotation), and deficits in both active and passive range of motion. This contrasts with conditions such as shoulder impingement syndrome, or rotator cuff tendinitis, in which the active range of motion is restricted but passive range of motion is normal. Some exam maneuvers of the shoulder may be impossible due to pain.

The symptoms of primary frozen shoulder have been classically described as having three stages.

- Stage one: The "freezing" or painful stage, which may last from two to nine months, and in which the patient has a slow onset of pain. As the pain worsens, the shoulder loses motion.
- Stage two: The "frozen" or adhesive stage is marked by a slow improvement in pain while stiffness remains. This stage generally lasts from four to twelve months.
- Stage three: The "thawing" or recovery stage, when shoulder motion slowly returns toward normal. This stage is characterized by minimal pain and generally lasts from 5 to 24 months.

Sometimes a fourth, prodromal stage is described occurring before the primary stages, as many as three months prior to the shoulder freezing. It is also known as the "prefreezing" stage. During this stage, people describe sharp pain at the end of their range of motion, achy pain at rest, and sleep disturbances.

== Causes ==
The exact causes of adhesive capsulitis are incompletely understood. However, the condition can sometimes occur after a known trigger, and there are several factors associated with higher risk. Adhesive capsulitis is classified depending on whether the trigger is unknown (primary) or known (secondary).

=== Primary ===
Primary adhesive capsulitis, also known as idiopathic adhesive capsulitis, occurs with no known trigger. It is more likely to develop in the non-dominant arm. This form of the condition is thought to occur when an unknown cause leads to an inflammatory reaction in the shoulder capsule. It is frequently associated with conditions that have a widespread inflammatory or autoimmune component, including diabetes and thyroid disorders. In fact, diabetic adhesive capsulitis is increasingly recognized as clinically distinct from other forms of adhesive capsulitis (based on differences in clinical outcomes, pathophysiology and gene expression). A new classification system has been proposed that separates diabetic adhesive capsulitis from other forms of the condition.

=== Secondary ===
Adhesive capsulitis is called secondary when it develops after a known event that directly affects shoulder mobility. Such events include shoulder injury, surgery (either on the shoulder or the chest wall), and periods of prolonged shoulder immobility.

== Pathophysiology ==
Adhesive capsulitis of the shoulder involves an inflammatory process within the joint, leading to the formation of scar tissue (adhesions) and shrinking (contracture) of the space inside the shoulder joint capsule. Pain-causing inflammatory cytokines are present in the joint fluid during the initial, painful stage (stage I). This inflammation is followed by an increase in fibroblasts, cells that deposit collagen fibers. This ultimately results in the formation of bulky, excessive collagen bands and a thickened joint capsule, limiting motion. Beyond this, the pathophysiology is poorly understood, including what causes the initial shoulder inflammation in many cases. Systemic inflammation appears to play a significant role in the development of adhesive capsulitis, and many diseases with an inflammatory component are associated with increased risk.

The first and most severely restricted motion is usually external rotation, primarily due to the thickening of the coracohumeral ligament which forms the roof of the rotator cuff. In addition, the thickened coracohumeral ligament contributes to limitations in internal rotation, as a result of its connection to other rotator cuff tendons. As adhesive capsulitis progresses, the shoulder capsule as a whole becomes thickened and stiff, shrinking the space inside the joint. This increased stiffness and decreased joint volume is associated with difficulty moving the arm forward and out to the side.

== Diagnosis ==
Adhesive capsulitis is traditionally diagnosed by history and physical exam. It is often a diagnosis of exclusion, meaning it is only diagnosed after other causes of shoulder pain and stiffness have been ruled out. On physical exam, adhesive capsulitis can be diagnosed if limits of the active range of motion are the same or similar to the limits to the passive range of motion - that is, motion stops at roughly same point whether the patient moves the arm independently or the examiner moves it passively. While the range of motion in external rotation is often the most severely limited, passive range of motion in abduction is particularly useful diagnostically: restriction below 80° is a strong indicator, and restriction below 40° is nearly 100% predictive of adhesive capsulitis.

=== Imaging ===
Imaging studies are not required for diagnosis, but may be used to rule out other causes of pain and are often able to confirm the presence of adhesive capsulitis. Radiographs will often be normal, but imaging features of adhesive capsulitis can be seen on ultrasound or MRI. When performed, ultrasound and MRI may reveal thickening of the coracohumeral ligament, and a width of greater than 3 mm is considered diagnostic for adhesive capsulitis.

Shoulders with adhesive capsulitis also characteristically fibrose and thicken at the axillary pouch and "rotator interval," seen on MRI as a dark signal on T1 sequences with edema and inflammation on T2 sequences. Grey-scale ultrasound is increasingly used in diagnosis of adhesive capsulitis, as it is cost-effective and available even to patients who cannot undergo an MRI. Inferior capsule/ axillary recess capsule, rotator interval abnormality, and restriction in range of motion in the shoulder can be detected using ultrasound.

== Management ==
Non-surgical management is the initial treatment of choice for frozen shoulder. Common treatments include exercise, physical therapy, oral anti-inflammatory medication, and corticosteroid injections into the joint. The effects of most treatments are primarily short-term, focusing on alleviating symptoms such as shoulder pain and reduced joint movement. Corticosteroid injections appear to provide the greatest short-term improvements in pain and range of motion, while long-term outcomes tend to be similar for most non-operative treatments. Non-surgical treatment may continue for months, with more complex treatments such as extracorporeal shock wave therapy, movement under anaesthesia, and hydrodilatation. Each of these treatments have been deemed effective but have had different benefits and drawbacks, meaning that clinicians and patients often decide together on the most appropriate treatment.

Most people (around 90%) can see their symptoms resolve with nonsurgical management alone. If conservative measures have no effect and the condition is long-lasting, or if evidence suggests surgical intervention, there are several operative procedures that can be used.

=== Non-operative management ===
==== Medication ====
Medications such as nonsteroidal anti-inflammatory drugs (NSAIDS) can be used for pain control, but evidence for their benefit is limited. Oral steroids may provide short-term benefits in range of movement and pain, but are not used routinely to treat adhesive capsulitis because of a high risk of side effects. Corticosteroids may also be used by local injection. In the short and medium term, corticosteroid injections appear most effective in pain alleviation and increase in range of motion, and benefits can last as long as six months. These injections have the most benefit when combined with structured physical therapy, but home exercise also increases their effectiveness.

==== Exercise and physical therapy ====
Shoulder stretching and strengthening exercises can improve shoulder function and decrease pain across all stages of adhesive capsulitis. Performing supervised exercise is more effective than exercise at home, but home exercise programs are still beneficial especially when combined with other treatments.

Various physical therapy techniques are helpful in treating adhesive capsulitis, but have different demonstrated rates of success. Posterior glenohumeral mobilization has shown a large effect; mirror therapy, rotator cuff strengthening, spray & stretch, and end range mobilization have demonstrated moderate results; continuous passive motion, scapular recognition, scapulothoracic exercises, yijin jing, and lower trapezius strengthening show only a small effect. Electromagnetic therapy, Kaltenborn mobilization, and instrument assisted soft tissue mobilization are not proven to be beneficial. This systematic review and meta-analysis found that combining acupuncture with physical therapy may reduce pain and improve shoulder range of motion more than physical therapy alone in patients with frozen shoulders.

Exercise and manual techniques are kept limited when pain is high, and gradually increased as pain subsides. Especially in the painful (freezing) stage of adhesive capsulitis, it is recommended that stretching exercises not exceed the threshold of pain and be kept short (1–5 seconds).

==== Other non-operative interventions ====
Nerve block at the suprascapular nerve (SSNB) is a minimally invasive procedure that can provide significant pain relief and functional improvement by directly blocking the main nerve for sensation to the shoulder (suprascapular nerve). There is some evidence that SSNB is superior to corticosteroid injections and physical therapy.

Hydrodilatation (injecting sterile saline water into the joint capsule) or distension arthrography can be effective for pain and function, but wide differences in protocol make the extent of benefit unclear. Hydrodilatation has also been combined with SSNB, but seems to provide no additional benefit.

Injections of platelet-rich plasma (PRP) have grown popular as an adjunct treatment. These injections have proven benefits for pain, function and range of motion, especially in the early stages (first 12 to 24 weeks).

Extracorporeal shock wave therapy can provide pain relief, and is also capable of improving function. Ultrasound deep heat therapy (UST) can decrease pain outcomes in adhesive capsulitis when combined with exercise or physical therapy. However, UST has not been shown to improve range of motion or function. When combined with stretching exercises, laser therapy can have similar effects: improving pain, but not helping with function.

=== Operative management ===
If conservative and interventional measures are unsuccessful, operative measures can be trialed. These options are typically considered after 9–12 months of nonsurgical management have failed. Two of the most common procedures are arthroscopic capsular release (ACR) surgery and manipulation under anaesthesia (MUA).

==== Surgery ====
Surgery to cut the adhesions (capsular release) may be indicated in prolonged and severe cases; the procedure is performed by arthroscopy. This type of surgery is minimally invasive, consisting of a small camera and small incisions. This technique allows the surgeon to find and correct the underlying cause of restricted shoulder movement (such as contracture of coracohumeral ligament and rotator interval). The surgeon will then make an incision to open the contracted shoulder capsule. This is followed by manipulating the shoulder manually with the arm, breaking up additional adhesions and confirming release of the capsule.

Arthroscopic capsular release surgery provides better range of motion outcomes than other interventions. The procedure has long-lasting effects with little risk of complications. Motion typically returns to that of the unaffected shoulder, though functional outcomes are slightly better for primary adhesive capsulitis compared to secondary.

Surgical evaluation of other potential problems with the shoulder, e.g., subacromial bursitis or rotator cuff tear, may be needed. Rotator cuff tears that exist alongside adhesive capsulitis can be addressed during the same surgery.

==== Manipulation under anesthesia ====
Performed in isolation or during capsular release surgery, manipulation under anaesthesia is a procedure that aims to directly break up adhesions in the shoulder by manually moving the arm. General anesthesia is given to prevent pain and resistance during the procedure. While manipulation under anaesthesia without capsular release surgery appears similarly effective and can be more cost-efficient, the procedure carries additional risk of fracture, dislocation, tendon rupture, and nerve injury.

==== Post-operative management ====
After surgery, it is recommended that rehabilitative physical therapy begin within 24–72 hours and continue 2-3 times per week for at least 6 weeks. Pain is expected during these exercises and multimodal pain control is used, but persistient pain is a reason for reassessment. Physical therapy is utilized to regain range of motion and prevent stiffness. Range of motion exercises, such as passive and active assisted exercises, are used first to provide mobility to the joints while preventing further stress/damage to the healing tissues. Stretching exercises are usually added later, followed by strengthening exercises. During the strengthening phase, muscles are put under stress to build support for the shoulder. Once the strengthening phase is complete, the individual gets reintroduced gradually to activities of daily living and prior training goals.

== Prognosis ==
Adhesive capsulitis is generally self-limiting, and has favorable long-term outcomes. Many people experience a painful "freezing" phase (2–9 months), stiff "frozen" phase (4–12 months) and "thawing" recovery phase (5–24 months), after which symptoms resolve. However, recovery can be slow and incomplete, with around 40% of people reporting symptoms even 4 years after onset. In the past, adhesive capsulitis was believed to resolve on its own within 1–2 years even without treatment, but this idea has been challenged by more recent evidence. Those who do not receive any treatment can experience protracted or incomplete resolution of their symptoms, while a significant majority will see their symptoms resolve with nonoperative management.

People who have diabetes (a significant risk factor for developing adhesive capsulitis) often experience worse outcomes, including relatively lower restored range of motion and pain reduction.

== Epidemiology ==
Adhesive capsulitis affects between 2-5% of the general population, and every year there are approximately 2.4 new cases per 1,000 people. The condition often develops in the sixth decade of life, and the average age at which symptoms begin is 56 years old.

Women are affected disproportionately - approximately 60-70% of people who experience adhesive capsulitis are female. Adhesive capsulitis is a known complication after breast surgery, and is 2-3 times more common in people with thyroid disorders (both of which are experienced more by women).

Rates are approximately 3 times higher in people with diabetes. Both type 1 diabetes and type 2 diabetes are risk factors for the condition. Other risk factors for developing adhesive capsulitis include the aforementioned thyroid disorders, prior shoulder surgery, hyperlipidemia (high cholesterol), cardiovascular disease, Parkinson's disease, obesity, osteoarthritis (especially of the shoulder), and evidence of systemic inflammation (elevated hs-CRP).

== See also ==
- Shoulder impingement syndrome
- Calcific tendinitis
- Milwaukee shoulder syndrome
- Shoulder injury related to vaccine administration
