= AMBE =

AMBE may refer to:

- Ambe, in anatomy, a superficial jutting out of a bone
- Advanced Multi-Band Excitation, digital voice encoder
- Ahkwesahsne Mohawk Board of Education
