= Hawkins–Kennedy test =

Orthopedic evaluation method

- Purpose: To evaluate a shoulder injury

The Hawkins–Kennedy Test is a test used in the evaluation of orthopedic shoulder injury. It was first described in the 1980s by Canadians R. Hawkins and J. Kennedy, and a positive test is most likely indicative of damage to the tendon of the supraspinatus muscle.

== Interpretation ==
A positive Hawkins–Kennedy test is indicative of an impingement of all structures that are located between the greater tubercle of the humerus and the coracohumeral ligament. The impinged structures include the supraspinatus muscle, teres minor muscle, and the infraspinatus muscle. The Hawkins–Kennedy test is considered to be a highly sensitive test (79%) and thus a negative Hawkins–Kennedy test suggests that injury is unlikely.

== Procedure ==
The patient is examined while sitting, with their shoulder flexed to 90° and their elbow flexed to 90°. The examiner grasps and supports proximal to both, the patient's wrist and elbow, to ensure maximal relaxation, then quickly rotates the patient's arm internally. Pain located below the acromioclavicular joint with internal rotation is considered a positive test result.
