= Fibrous capsule =

Fibrous capsule may refer to:

- Fibrous capsule of Glisson
- Fibrous membrane of articular capsule
