= Milwaukee shoulder syndrome =

- Specialty: Rheumotology

Milwaukee shoulder syndrome (MSS) (apatite-associated destructive arthritis/Basic calcium phosphate (BCP) crystal arthritis/rapid destructive arthritis of the shoulder) is a rare rheumatological condition similar to pseudogout, associated with periarticular or intra-articular deposition of hydroxyapatite or basic calcium phosphate (BCP) crystals. While primarily associated with the shoulder joint, it can affect any joint in the body below the head. Along with symptomatology, the disease typically presents with positive radiologic findings, often showing marked erosion of the humeral head, cartilage, capsule, and bursae. Though rare, it is most often seen in females beginning in their 50s or 60s. Patients often have a history of joint trauma or overuse, calcium pyrophosphate dehydrate crystal deposition, neuroarthropathy, dialysis-related arthropathy or denervation.

== Nomenclature ==
According to Nadarajah and Weikert, "[t]he term Milwaukee shoulder syndrome was first used in 1981 to describe four elderly women in Milwaukee... with recurrent bilateral shoulder effusions, radiographic evidence of severe destructive changes of the glenohumeral joints, and massive tears of the rotator cuff."

== Signs and symptoms ==
Signs and symptoms may include the following:

- Limited active range of motion, usually unrestricted passive range of movement (early)
- Joint pain
- Joint inflammation and tenderness
- Synovial hemorrhagic effusion/hematoma
- Radiologic positive findings
- Hydroxyapatite crystals in synovial fluid

== Diagnosis ==
Diagnosis is made with arthrocentesis and Alizarin Red staining along with clinical symptoms. X-rays, arthrography, ultrasonography, CT imaging and MRI imaging are also helpful in diagnosing this condition

== Causes ==
Hydroxyapatite crystal deposition in the joint causes the release of collagenases, serine proteases, elastases, and interleukin-1. This leads to acute and rapid decline in joint function and degradation of joint anatomy. Subsequently, disruption of the rotator cuff ensues.

== Treatment ==
Treatment may include the prescription of one or more of the following:

- Non-steroidal anti-inflammatory drugs (NSAIDs)
- Intra-articular steroids
- Physical therapy
- Partial or complete arthroplasty
