= Shoulder injury related to vaccine administration =

Shoulder injury related to vaccine administration (SIRVA) is a medical condition defined as "shoulder pain and limited range of motion occurring after the administration of a vaccine intended for intramuscular administration in the upper arm... thought to occur as a result of unintended injection of vaccine antigen or trauma from the needle into and around the underlying bursa of the shoulder".

== Cause ==
SIRVA is caused by improper insertion of the needle used in injections. It is "a preventable occurrence caused by the injection of a vaccine into the shoulder capsule rather than the deltoid muscle. As a result, inflammation of the shoulder structures causes patients to experience pain, a decreased range of motion, and a decreased quality of life."

A 2022 review of the literature suggested that SIRVA was a possible complication of COVID-19 vaccination, and that needle technique should be carefully monitored in view of the scale of the COVID-19 vaccination programme.

== Treatment ==
"Treatment for SIRVA is the same as treatment for routine inflammatory injuries." People who suffer from extreme cases of SIRVA typically require physical therapy, pain management medications, and in some severe cases, surgery.

== Compensation ==
In the United States, SIRVA was added to the list of compensable injuries on the Vaccine Injury Table used by the National Vaccine Injury Compensation Program in 2017. This inclusion allowed persons claiming an injury to seek compensation from a government fund set up under the program, while immunizing vaccine manufacturers and administrators from legal liability. By 2020, SIRVA injuries amounted to 54% of filings for vaccine injury compensation. In April 2020, the U.S. Department of Health and Human Services began considering a proposal to remove the injury from that table, following a substantial increase in the number of claims asserting this injury, and on July 20, 2020, the department posted its official notice that it would seek to remove SIRVA (as well as vasovagal syncope) from the vaccine injury compensation scheme.

In support of its proposed removal of the injury from the table, the department asserted:

The scientific literature indicates that SIRVA likely results from poor vaccination technique, rather than the vaccine or its components alone. ... There is nearly uniform agreement in the scientific community that SIRVA is caused by improper vaccine administration, rather than by the vaccine itself. Since the Final Rule was promulgated, additional scientific research concluded that subdeltoid or subacromial bursitis and other shoulder lesions are "more likely to be the consequence of a poor injection technique (site, angle, needle size, and failure to take into account [a] patient's characteristics, i.e., sex, body weight, and physical constitution)," rather than "antigens or adjuvants contained in the vaccines that would trigger an immune or inflammatory response."

A number of contrary opinions were filed in response to the proposal, but the removal was made final on January 21, 2021. This removal was, in turn, reversed by a rule promulgated on April 21, 2021, restoring SIRVA to the table.
