= Hydrodilatation =

Medical treatment for adhesive capsulitis of shoulder

- Other names: Distension arthrography

Hydrodilatation or hydraulic arthrographic capsular distension or distension arthrography is a medical treatment for adhesive capsulitis of the shoulder. The treatment is applied by a radiologist assisted by a radiographer. Contrast medium, a local anaesthetic and cortisone are injected into the joint. Then up to 40ml of sterile saline solution are injected, using X-ray as guidance, to stretch the joint capsule. Risk of complications is low. Whether the treatment is successful is known after a couple of weeks.

The procedure is performed under imaging guidance, using either fluoroscopy, ultrasound or computed tomography (CT). Hydrodilatation is felt to provide benefit via two mechanisms: manual stretching of the capsule and thus disruption of adhesions which are characteristic of adhesive capsulitis, and; the introduction of cortisone provides a potent anti-inflammatory effect and thus prevents further adhesion recurrence.

Research in 2008 has questioned the benefit of hydrodilatation as giving no statistical benefit over injecting cortisone alone.
