= Capsule of the glenohumeral joint =

Articular capsule of the shoulder joint

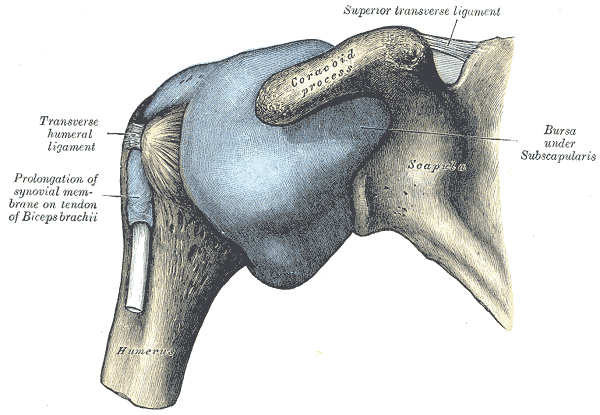
- The capsule seen from the front

Details
- Location: Shoulder joint

Identifiers
- Latin: capsula articularis articularis humeri

The capsule of the glenohumeral (shoulder) joint is the articular capsule of the shoulder. It completely surrounds the joint. It is attached above to the circumference of the glenoid cavity beyond the glenoidal labrum, and below to the anatomical neck of the humerus, approaching nearer to the articular cartilage above than in the rest of its extent.

It is thicker above and below than elsewhere, and is so remarkably loose and lax, that it has no action in keeping the bones in contact, but allows them to be separated from each other more than 2.5 cm, an evident provision for that extreme freedom of movement which is peculiar to this articulation.

It is strengthened, above, by the supraspinatus; below, by the long head of the triceps brachii; behind, by the tendons of the infraspinatus and teres minor; and in front, by the tendon of the subscapularis.

== Structure ==
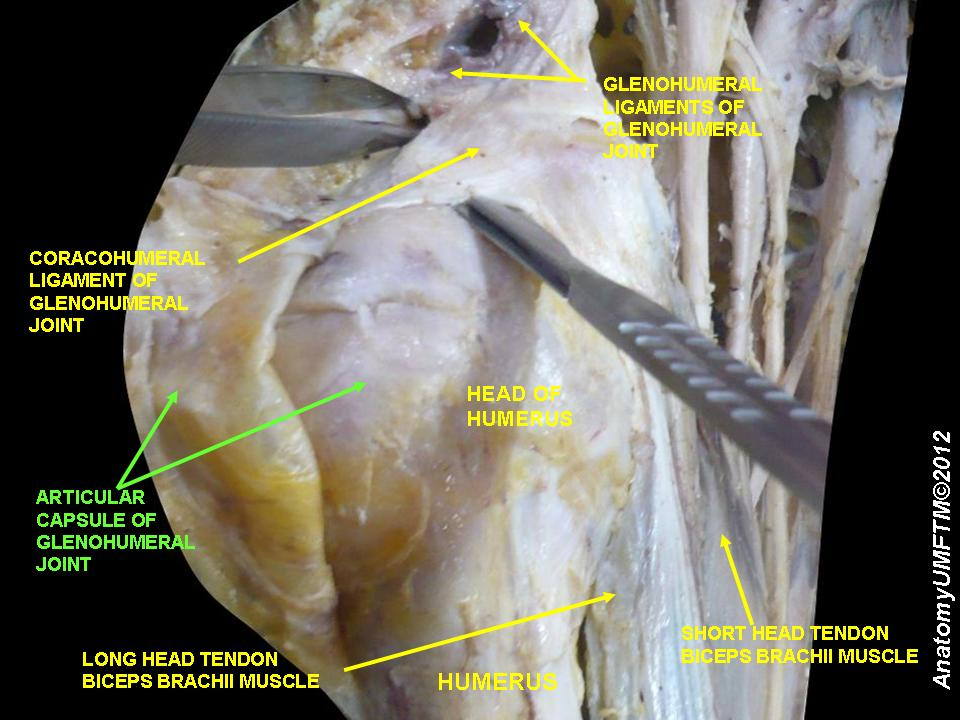
Articular capsule of glenohumeral joint

There are usually three openings in the capsule.

- One anteriorly, below the coracoid process, establishes a communication between the joint and a bursa beneath the tendon of the Subscapularis.
- The second, which is not constant, is at the posterior part, where an opening sometimes exists between the joint and a bursal sac under the tendon of the Infraspinatus.
- The third is between the tubercles of the humerus, for the passage of the long tendon of the Biceps brachii.

== Clinical significance ==
Adhesive capsulitis or frozen shoulder syndrome is a common shoulder capsule pathology that results when injury, surgery, or other chronic health conditions such as diabetes and arthritis damage or loosen the shoulder joint. As a result of the damage, the shoulder capsule becomes inflamed and taut, leading to stiffness, pain, and limited range of motion in the shoulder area. Range of motion can usually be restored by treating the affected area with heat and non-steroidal anti-inflammatory drugs (NSAIDs) in addition to light stretching and or a disciplined physical therapy program. In extreme cases where medication and physical therapy prove to be ineffective in treating the condition, arthroscopic surgery (known as Arthroscopic Capsular Release) can be performed to loosen the capsule by removing regions of thickened scar tissue within and around the shoulder joint.
