= Shoulder =

Part of the body

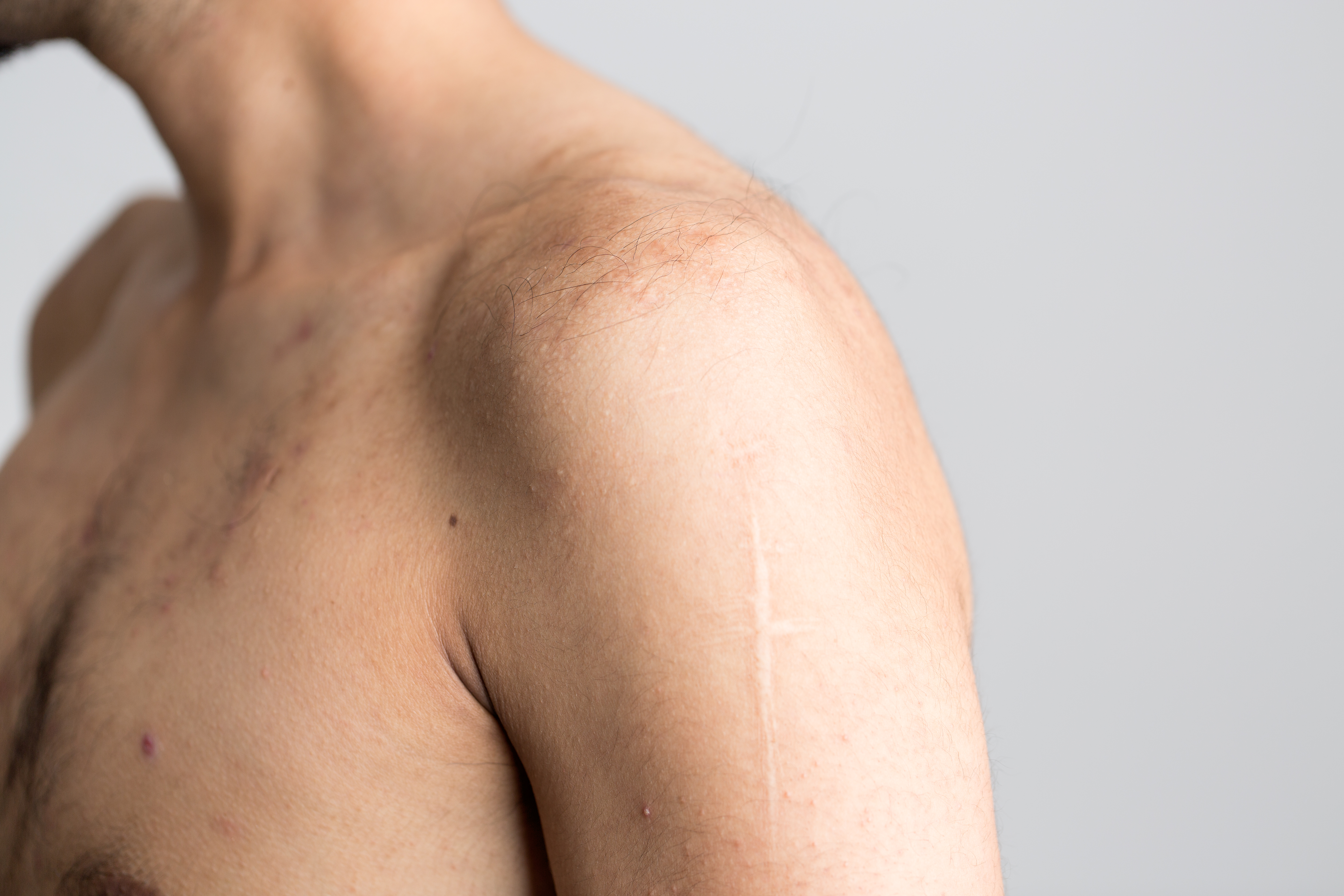
- Human shoulder

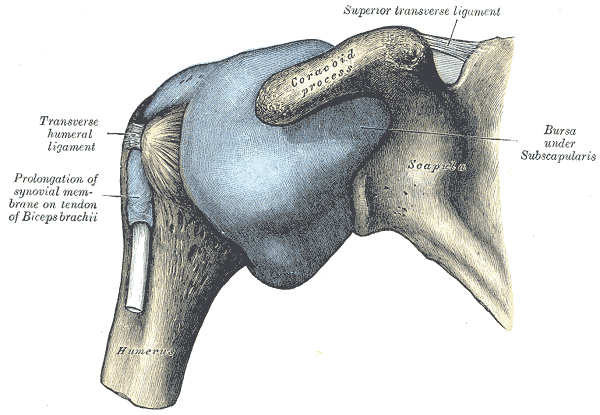
- Capsule of shoulder-joint (distended). Anterior aspect.

Details

Identifiers
- Latin: articulatio humeri
- MeSH: D012782
- TA98: A01.1.00.020
- TA2: 139
- FMA: 25202

The human shoulder is made up of three bones: the clavicle (collarbone), the scapula (shoulder blade), and the humerus (upper arm bone) as well as associated muscles, ligaments and tendons.

The articulations between the bones of the shoulder make up the shoulder joints. The shoulder joint, also known as the glenohumeral joint, is the major joint of the shoulder, but can more broadly include the acromioclavicular joint.

In human anatomy, the shoulder joint comprises the part of the body where the humerus attaches to the scapula, and the head sits in the glenoid cavity. The shoulder is the group of structures in the region of the joint.

The shoulder joint is the main joint of the shoulder. It is a ball and socket joint that allows the arm to rotate in a circular fashion or to hinge out and up away from the body. The joint capsule is a soft tissue envelope that encircles the glenohumeral joint and attaches to the scapula, humerus, and head of the biceps. It is lined by a thin, smooth synovial membrane. The rotator cuff is a group of four muscles that surround the shoulder joint and contribute to the shoulder's stability. The muscles of the rotator cuff are supraspinatus, subscapularis, infraspinatus, and teres minor. The cuff adheres to the glenohumeral capsule and attaches to the humeral head.

The shoulder must be mobile enough for the wide range actions of the arms and hands, but stable enough to allow for actions such as lifting, pushing, and pulling.

== Structure ==
The shoulder consists of a ball-and-socket joint formed by the humerus and scapula and their surrounding structures - ligaments, muscles, tendons - which support the bones and maintain the relationship of one to another. These supporting structures attach to the clavicle, humerus, and scapula, the latter providing the glenoid cavity, acromion and coracoid processes. The main joint of the shoulder is the shoulder joint (or glenohumeral joint), between the humerus and the glenoid process of the scapular. The acromioclavicular joint and sternoclavicular joint also play a role in shoulder movements. White hyaline cartilage on the ends of the bones (called articular cartilage) allows the bones to glide and move on each other, and the joint space is surrounded by a synovial membrane. Around the joint space are muscles - the rotator cuff, which directly surrounds and attaches to the shoulder joint - and other muscles that help provide stability and facilitate movement.

Two filmy sac-like structures called bursae permit smooth gliding between bone, muscle, and tendon. They cushion and protect the rotator cuff from the bony arch of the acromion.

The glenoid labrum is the second kind of cartilage in the shoulder which is distinctly different from the articular cartilage. This cartilage is more fibrous or rigid than the cartilage on the ends of the ball and socket. Also, this cartilage is also found only around the socket where it is attached.

=== Joint ===
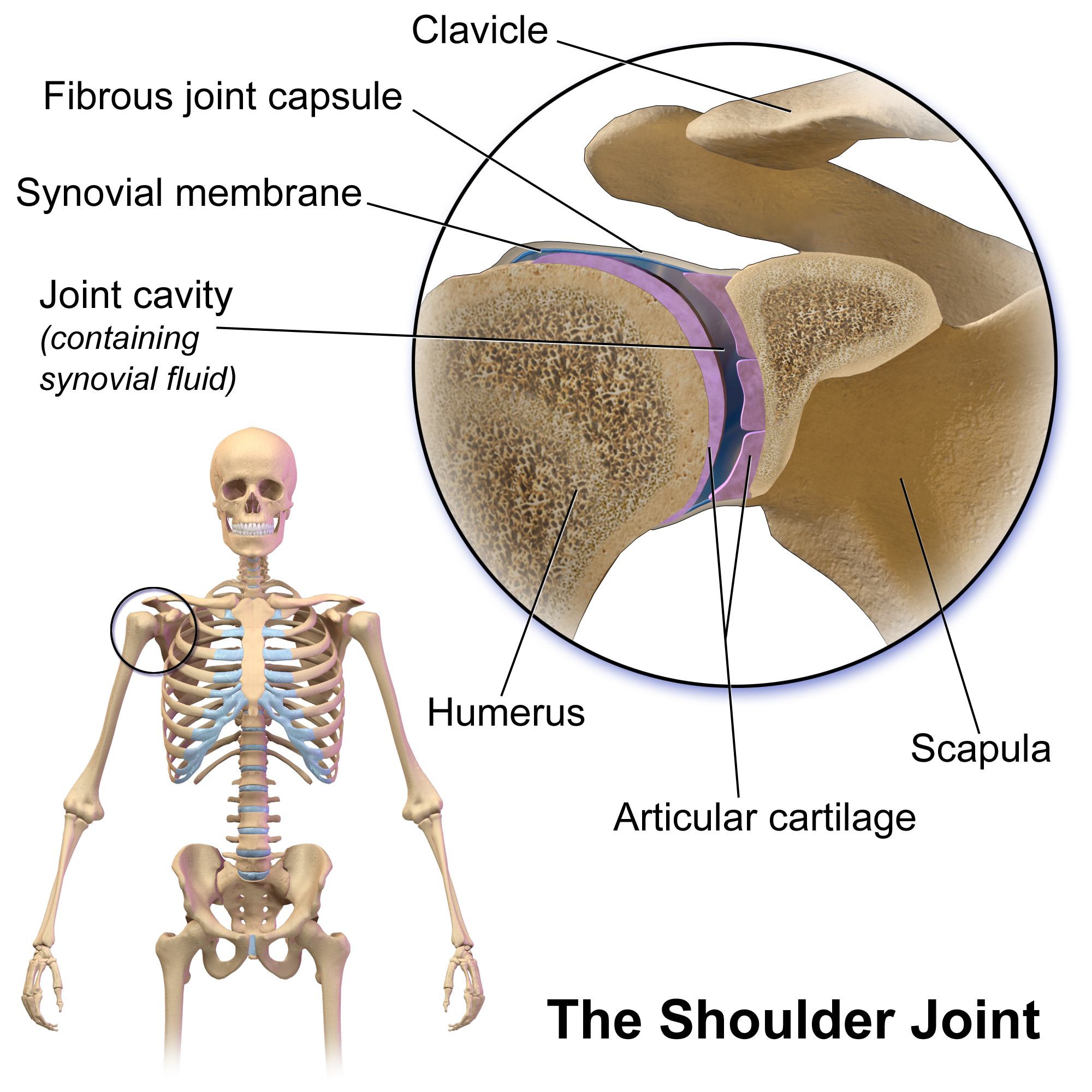
Cross-section of shoulder joint

The shoulder joint (also known as the glenohumeral joint) is the main joint of the shoulder. It is a ball and socket joint that allows the arm to rotate in a circular fashion or to hinge out and up away from the body. It is formed by the articulation between the head of the humerus and the lateral scapula (specifically-the glenoid cavity of the scapula). The "ball" of the joint is the rounded, medial anterior surface of the humerus and the "socket" is formed by the glenoid cavity, the dish-shaped portion of the lateral scapula. The shallowness of the cavity and relatively loose connections between the shoulder and the rest of the body allows the arm to have tremendous mobility, at the expense of being much easier to dislocate than most other joints in the body. There is an approximately 4-to-1 disproportion in size between the large head of the humerus and the shallow glenoid cavity.The glenoid cavity is made deeper by the addition of the fibrocartilaginous ring of the glenoid labrum.

The capsule is a soft tissue envelope that encircles the glenohumeral joint and attaches to the scapula, humerus, and head of the biceps. It is lined by a thin, smooth synovial membrane. This capsule is strengthened by the coracohumeral ligament which attaches the coracoid process of the scapula to the greater tubercle of the humerus. There are also three other ligaments attaching the lesser tubercle of the humerus to lateral scapula and are collectively called the glenohumeral ligaments.

The transverse humeral ligament, which passes from the lesser tubercle to the greater tubercle of humerus, covers the intertubercular groove, in which the long head of biceps brachii travels.

=== Rotator cuff ===
Shoulder anatomy, front view

Shoulder anatomy, back view

The rotator cuff is an anatomical term given to the group of four muscles and their tendons that act to stabilize the shoulder. These muscles are the supraspinatus, infraspinatus, teres minor and subscapularis and that hold the head of the humerus in the glenoid cavity during movement. The cuff adheres to the glenohumeral capsule and attaches to the head of the humerus. Together, these keep the humeral head in the glenoid cavity, preventing upward migration of the humeral head caused by the pull of the deltoid muscle at the beginning of arm elevation. The infraspinatus and the teres minor, along with the anterior fibers of the deltoid muscle, are responsible for external rotation of the arm.

The four tendons of these muscles converge to form the rotator cuff tendon. This tendon, along with the articular capsule, the coracohumeral ligament, and the glenohumeral ligament complex, blend into a confluent sheet before insertion into the humeral tuberosities. The infraspinatus and teres minor fuse near their musculotendinous junctions, while the supraspinatus and subscapularis tendons join as a sheath that surrounds the biceps tendon at the entrance of the bicipital groove.

=== Other muscles ===
Muscles from the shoulder region

In addition to the four muscles of the rotator cuff, the deltoid muscle and teres major muscles arise and exist in the shoulder region itself. The deltoid muscle covers the shoulder joint on three sides, arising from the front upper third of the clavicle, the acromion, and the spine of the scapula, and travelling to insert on the deltoid tubercle of the humerus. Contraction of each part of the deltoid assists in different movements of the shoulder - flexion (clavicular part), abduction (middle part) and extension (scapular part). The teres major attaches to the outer part of the back of the scapula, beneath the teres minor, and attaches to the upper part of the humerus. It helps with medial rotation of the humerus.

Muscles from the front

Muscles from the chest wall that contribute to the shoulder are:

Name	Attachment	Function
serratus anterior	Originates on the surface of the upper eight ribs at the side of the chest and inserts along the entire anterior length of the medial border of the scapula.	It fixes the scapula into the thoracic wall and aids in rotation and abduction of the shoulders.
subclavius	Located beneath the clavicle, originating from the first rib and inserting on the subclavian groove of the clavicle.	It depresses the lateral clavicle and also acts to stabilize the clavicle.
pectoralis minor	Arises from the third, fourth, and fifth ribs, near their cartilage and inserts into the medial border and upper surface of the coracoid process of the scapula.	This muscle aids in respiration, medially rotates the scapula, protracts the scapula, and also draws the scapula inferiorly.
sternocleidomastoid	Attaches to the sternum (sterno-), the clavicle (cleido-), and the mastoid process of the temporal bone of the skull.	Most of its actions flex and rotate the head. In regards to the shoulder, however, it also aids in respiration by elevating the sternoclavicular joint when the head is fixed.
levator scapulae	Arises from the transverse processes of the first four cervical vertebrae and inserts into the medial border of the scapula.	It is capable of rotating the scapula downward and elevating the scapula.

Muscles from the back

rhomboid major and rhomboid minor (work together)	They arise from the spinous processes of the thoracic vertebrae T1 to T5 as well as from the spinous processes of the seventh cervical. They attach to the inner border of the scapula.	They are responsible for downward rotation of the scapula with the levator scapulae, as well as adduction of the scapula.
trapezius	Arises from the occipital bone, the ligamentum nuchae, the spinous process of the seventh cervical, and the spinous processes of all the thoracic vertebrae. It attaches to the outer clavicle, the acromion process, and into the spine of the scapula.	Different portions of the fibers perform different actions on the scapula: depression, upward rotation, elevation, and retraction.
levator scapulae	Arises from the transverse processes of cervical vertebrae 1-4, and attaches to the upper part of the inner border of the scapula.	Elevates the scapula.
latissimus dorsi	A large muscle that arises from the spinous processes of the lower six thoracic vertebrae, lumbar and all sacral vertebrae, and posterior iliac crest. It attaches to the intertubercular groove of the humerus.	Adducts, extends and rotates the humerus inwards.

=== Armpit ===
The armpit (Latin: axilla) is formed by the space between the muscles of the shoulder. The nerves and blood vessels of the arm travel through the armpit, and it possesses several sets of lymph nodes that are able to be examined. The armpit is formed by the pectoralis major and minor muscles at the front, the latissimus dorsi and teres major muscles at the back, the serratus anterior muscle on its inner surface, and the intertubercular groove of the humerus on the outer side.

=== Nerve supply and passage ===
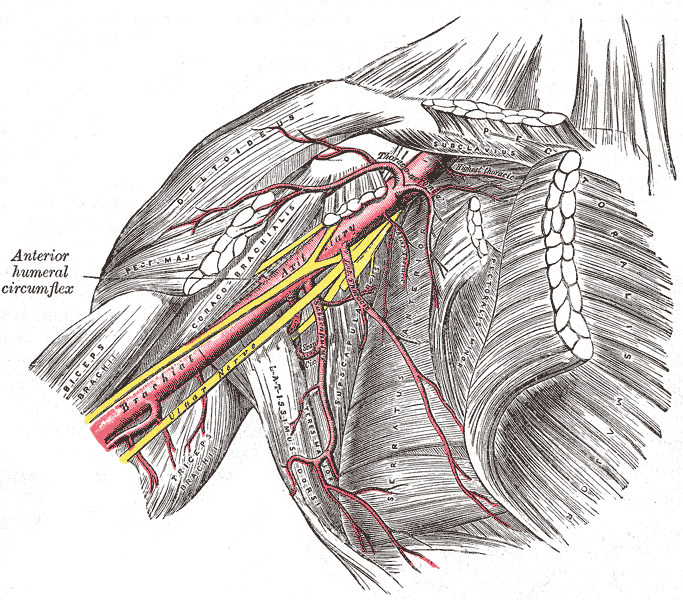
The brachial plexus surrounds the axillary artery and is formed from nerve roots from C5-T1. Branches of the plexus supply the shoulder region, although several other nerves play a role.

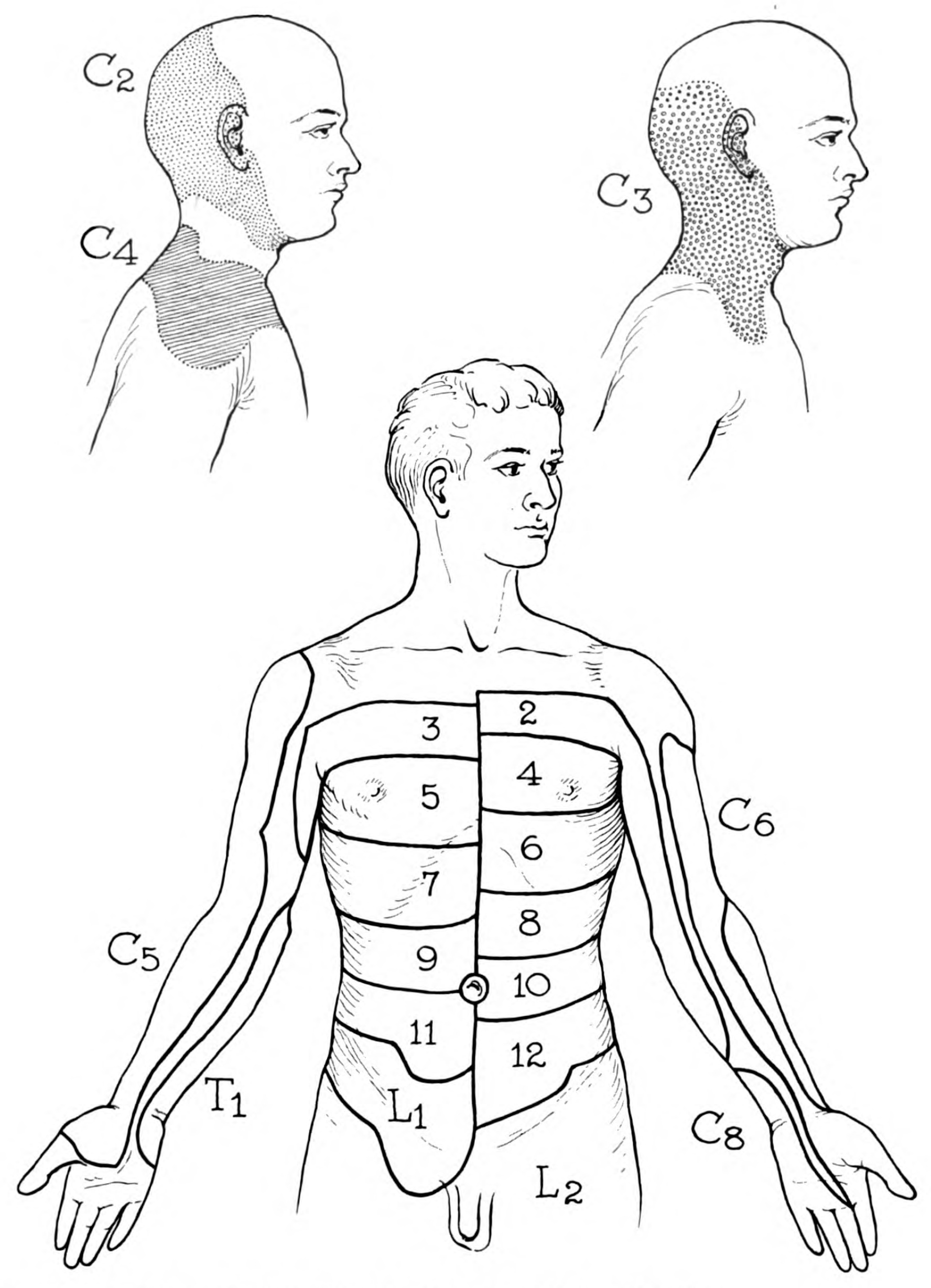
Nerve roots that supply sensation to the shoulder and arm

Nerves that supply sensation to the shoulder and arm

The skin around the shoulder is supplied by C2-C4 (upper), and C7 and T2 (lower area). The brachial plexus emerges as nerve roots from the cervical vertebrae C5-T1. Branches of the plexus, in particular from C5-C6, supply the majority of the muscles of the shoulder.

=== Blood vessels ===
The subclavian artery arises from the brachiocephalic trunk on the right and directly from the aorta from the left. This becomes the axillary artery as it passes beyond the first rib. The axillary artery also supplies blood to the arm, and is one of the major sources of blood to the shoulder region. The other major sources are the transverse cervical artery and the suprascapular artery, both branches of the thyrocervical trunk which itself is a branch of the subclavian artery. The blood vessels form a network (anastomosis) behind the shoulder that helps to supply blood to the arm even when the axillary artery is compromised.

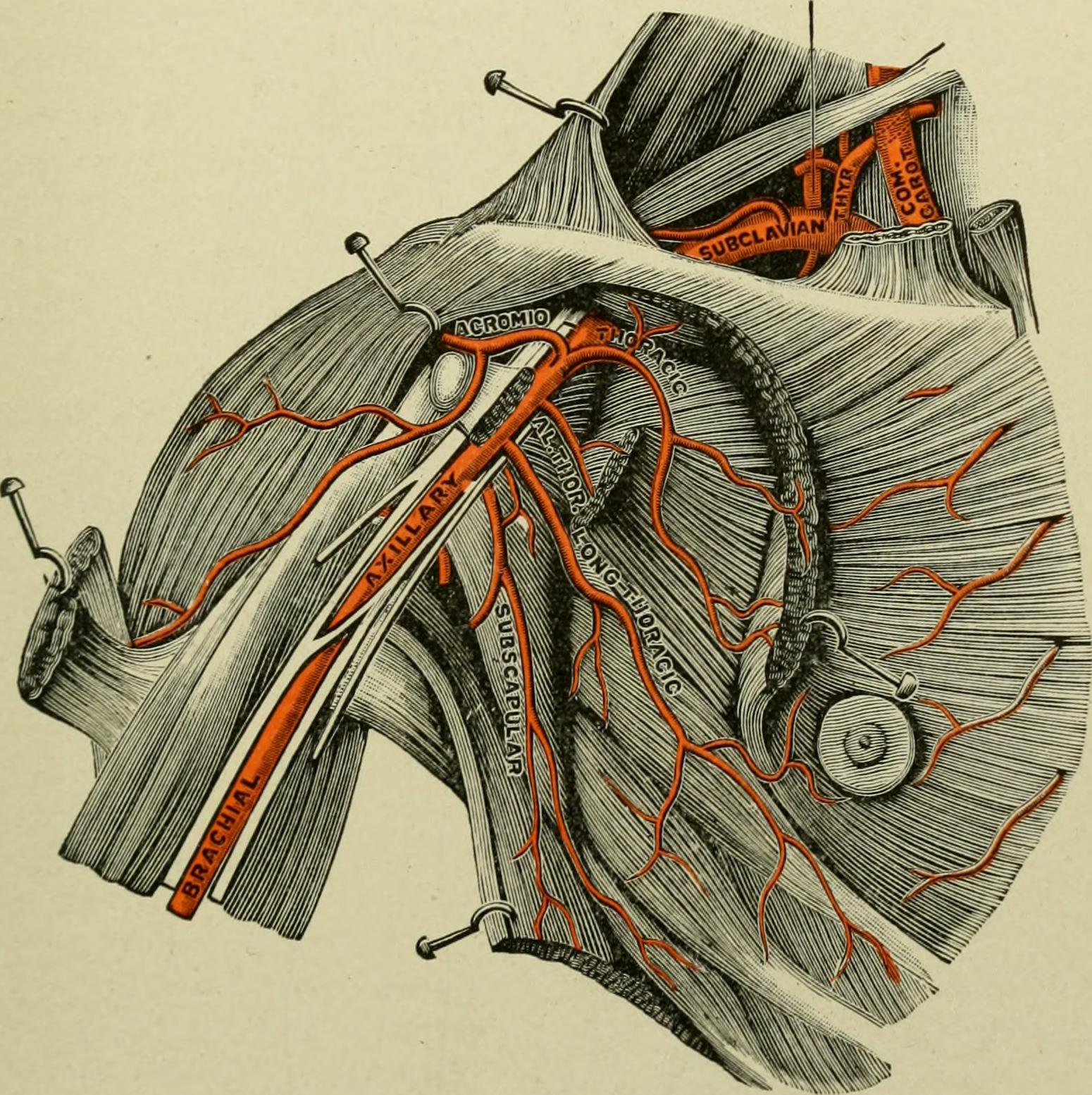
The axillary artery supplies blood to the arm and is one of the major sources of blood for the shoulder region.

== Function ==
The muscles and joints of the shoulder allow it to move through a remarkable range of motion, making it one of the most mobile joints in the human body. The shoulder can abduct, adduct, rotate, be raised in front of and behind the torso and move through a full 360° in the sagittal plane. This tremendous range of motion also makes the shoulder extremely unstable, far more prone to dislocation and injury than other joints

The following describes the terms used for different movements of the shoulder:

Name	Description	Muscles
Scapular retraction (aka scapular adduction)	The scapula is moved posteriorly and medially along the back, moving the arm and shoulder joint posteriorly. Retracting both scapulae gives a sensation of "squeezing the shoulder blades together."	rhomboideus major, minor, and trapezius
Scapular protraction (aka scapular abduction)	The opposite motion of scapular retraction. The scapula is moved anteriorly and laterally along the back, moving the arm and shoulder joint anteriorly. If both scapulae are protracted, the scapulae are separated and the pectoralis major muscles are squeezed together.	serratus anterior (prime mover), pectoralis minor and major
Scapular elevation	The scapula is raised in a shrugging motion.	levator scapulae, the upper fibers of the trapezius
Scapular depression	The scapula is lowered from elevation. The scapulae may be depressed so that the angle formed by the neck and shoulders is obtuse, giving the appearance of "slumped" shoulders.	pectoralis minor, lower fibers of the trapezius, subclavius, latissimus dorsi
Arm abduction	Arm abduction occurs when the arms are held at the sides, parallel to the length of the torso, and are then raised in the plane of the torso. This movement may be broken down into two parts: True abduction of the arm, which takes the humerus from parallel to the spine to perpendicular; and upward rotation of the scapula, which raises the humerus above the shoulders until it points straight upwards.	True abduction: supraspinatus (first 15 degrees), deltoid; Upward rotation: trapezius, serratus anterior
Arm adduction	Arm adduction is the opposite motion of arm abduction. It can be broken down into two parts: downward rotation of the scapula and true adduction of the arm.	Downward rotation: pectoralis minor, pectoralis major, subclavius, latissimus dorsi (same as scapular depression, with pec major replacing lower fibers of trapezius); True Adduction: latissimus dorsi, subscapularis, teres major, infraspinatus, teres minor, pectoralis major, long head of triceps, coracobrachialis.
Arm flexion	The humerus is rotated out of the plane of the torso so that it points forward (anteriorly).	pectoralis major, coracobrachialis, biceps brachii, anterior fibers of deltoid.
Arm extension	The humerus is rotated out of the plane of the torso so that it points backwards (posteriorly)	latissimus dorsi and teres major, long head of triceps, posterior fibers of the deltoid
Medial rotation of the arm	Medial rotation of the arm is most easily observed when the elbow is held at a 90-degree angle and the fingers are extended so they are parallel to the ground. Medial rotation occurs when the arm is rotated at the shoulder so that the fingers change from pointing straight forward to pointing across the body.	subscapularis, latissimus dorsi, teres major, pectoralis major, anterior fibers of deltoid
Lateral rotation of the arm	The opposite of medial rotation of the arm.	infraspinatus and teres minor, posterior fibers of deltoid
Arm circumduction	Movement of the shoulder in a circular motion so that if the elbow and fingers are fully extended the subject draws a circle in the air lateral to the body. In circumduction, the arm is not lifted above parallel to the ground so that "circle" that is drawn is flattened on top.	pectoralis major, subscapularis, coracobrachialis, biceps brachii, supraspinatus, deltoid, latissimus dorsi, teres major and minor, infraspinatus, long head of triceps

== Development ==
=== Sexual dimorphism ===
Under the influence of testosterone and growth hormone, the shoulders broaden in males during puberty.

The width of the shoulders may be reduced by shortening the clavicle; removing a segment of bone from each side. This operation is variously called shoulder width reduction, clavicle reconstruction, or clavicle shortening.

== Clinical significance ==
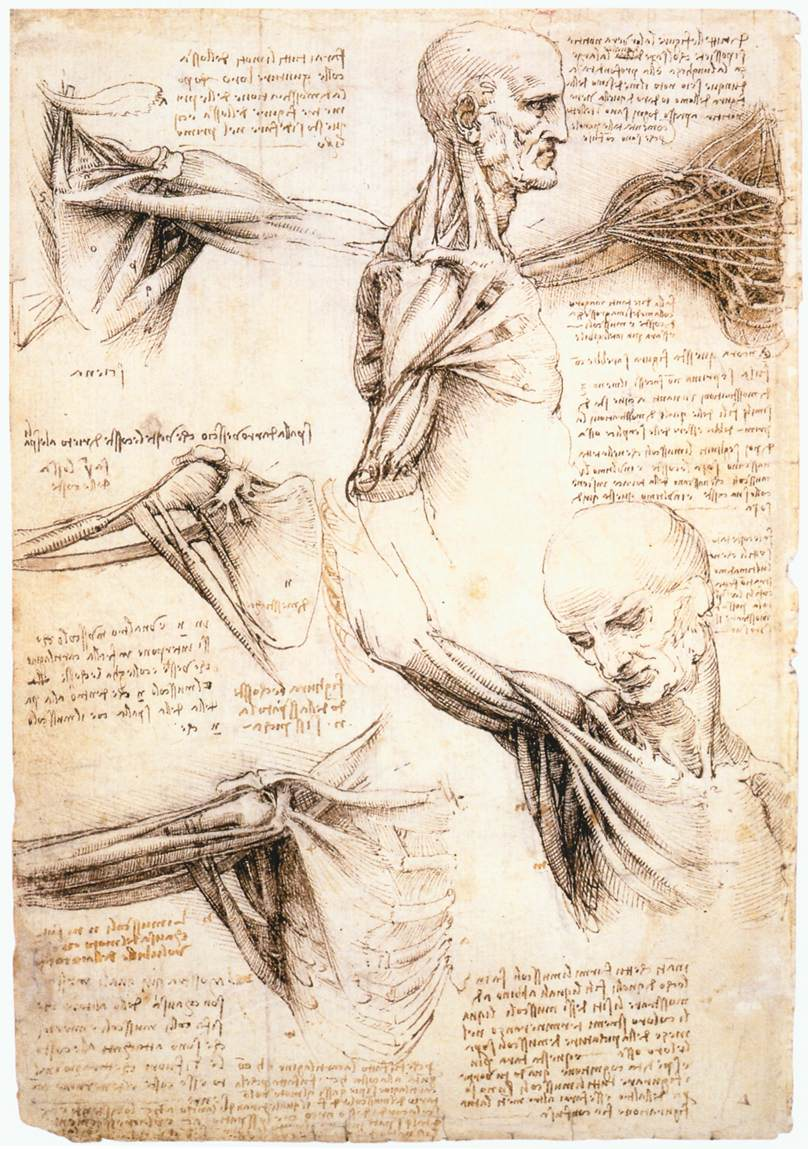
Anatomical studies of the shoulder by Leonardo da Vinci (ca.1510)

The shoulder is the most mobile and potentially unstable joint in the body. Due to this, it is often prone to problems.

=== Fracture ===
Fractures of shoulder bones can include clavicular fractures, scapular fractures, and fractures of the upper humerus.

=== Pain ===
Shoulder problems, including pain, are common and can relate to any of the structures within the shoulder. The primary cause of shoulder pain is a rotator cuff tear. The supraspinatus is most commonly involved in a rotator cuff tear, but other parts of the rotator cuff may also be involved. There are different severities of a rotator cuff tear, which range from a partial tear to a full-thickness tear. A partial tear is when the tendon is thinned, but still connected to the bone. Full-thickness tears can be separated into two classes: a full-thickness incomplete tear or a full-thickness complete tear. The incomplete tear is characterized by having only a portion of the tendon disconnected from the bone, where the complete tear has the tendon completely separated off the bone. For all forms of rotator cuff tears, depending on the severity of the injury, possible treatments include rest, an arm sling, physical therapy, steroid injections, and non-steroidal anti-inflammatory drugs, or surgery.

When this type of cartilage starts to wear out (a process called arthritis), the joint becomes painful and stiff.

- Arthritis
- Frozen shoulder
- Impingement syndrome
- Shoulder dislocation
- Nerve entrapment syndrome

=== Imaging ===
Imaging of the shoulder includes ultrasound, X-ray and MRI, and is guided by the suspected diagnosis and presenting symptoms.

Conventional x-rays and ultrasonography are the primary tools used to confirm a diagnosis of injuries sustained to the rotator cuff. For extended clinical questions, imaging through Magnetic Resonance with or without intraarticular contrast agent is indicated.

Hodler et al. recommend starting scanning with conventional x-rays taken from at least two planes, since this method gives a wide first impression and even has the chance of exposing any frequent shoulder pathologies, i.e., decompensated rotator cuff tears, tendinitis calcarea, dislocations, fractures, usures, and/or osteophytes. Furthermore, x-rays are required for the planning of an optimal CT or MR image.

The conventional invasive arthrography is nowadays being replaced by the non-invasive MRI and ultrasound, and is used as an imaging reserve for patients who are contraindicated for MRI, for example pacemaker-carriers with an unclear and unsure ultrasonography.

==== X-ray ====
Projectional radiography views of the shoulder include:

AP-projection 40° posterior oblique after Grashey

The body has to be rotated about 30 to 45 degrees towards the shoulder to be imaged, and the standing or sitting patient lets the arm hang. This method reveals the joint gap and the vertical alignment towards the socket.

Transaxillary projection

The arm should be abducted 80 to 100 degrees. This method reveals:

- The horizontal alignment of the humerus head in respect to the socket and the lateral clavicle in respect to the acromion
- Lesions of the anterior and posterior socket border, or of the tuberculum minus
- The eventual non-closure of the acromial apophysis
- The coraco-humeral interval

Y-projection

The lateral contour of the shoulder should be positioned in front of the film in a way that the longitudinal axis of the scapula continues parallel to the path of the rays. This method reveals:

- The horizontal centralization of the humerus head and socket
- The osseous margins of the coraco-acromial arch and hence the supraspinatus outlet canal
- The shape of the acromion

This projection has a low tolerance for errors and, accordingly, needs proper execution. The Y-projection can be traced back to Wijnblath’s 1933 published cavitas-en-face projection.

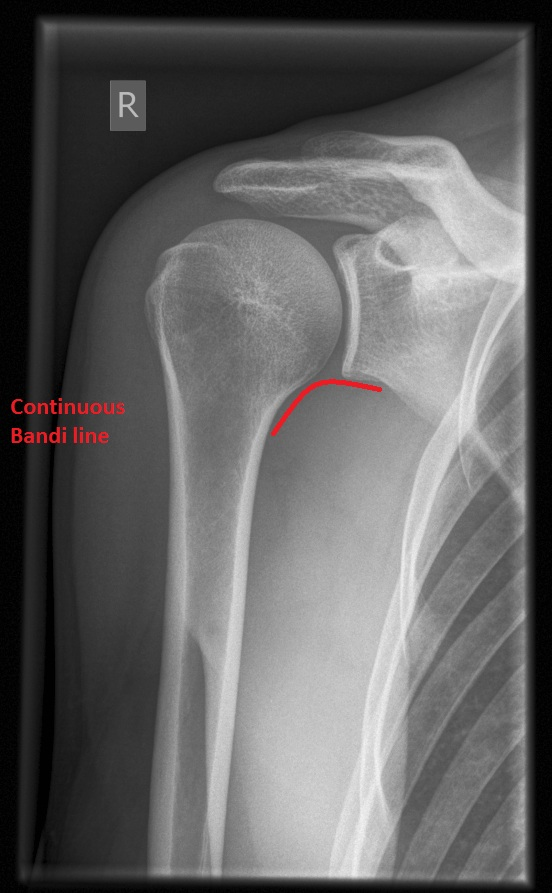
CR. shoulay film.

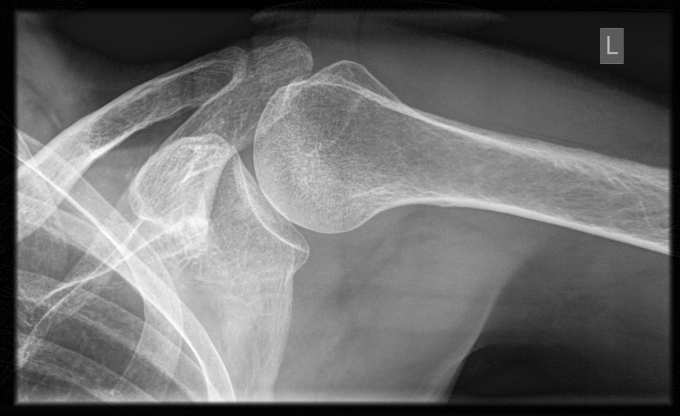
Transaxillary conventional radiography

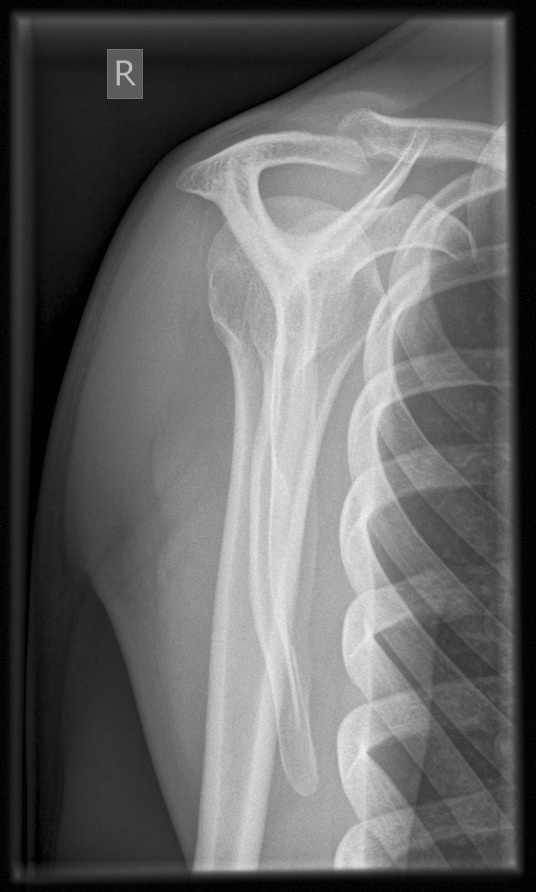
Y-projection conventional radiography

==== Ultrasound ====
There are several advantages of ultrasound. It is relatively cheap, does not emit any radiation, is accessible, is capable of visualizing tissue function in real time, and allows the performance of provocative maneuvers in order to replicate the patient’s pain. Those benefits have helped ultrasound become a common initial choice for assessing tendons and soft tissues. Limitations include, for example, the high degree of operator dependence and the inability to define pathologies in bones. One also has to have an extensive anatomical knowledge of the examined region and keep an open mind to normal variations and artifacts created during the scan.

Although musculoskeletal ultrasound training, like medical training in general, is a lifelong process, Kissin et al. suggests that rheumatologists who taught themselves how to manipulate ultrasound can use it just as well as international musculo-skeletal ultrasound experts to diagnose common rheumatic conditions.

After the introduction of high-frequency transducers in the mid-1980s, ultrasound has become a conventional tool for taking accurate and precise images of the shoulder to support diagnosis.

Adequate for the examination are high-resolution, high-frequency transducers with a transmission frequency of 5, 7.5, and 10 MHz. To improve the focus on structures close to the skin an additional "water start-up length" is advisable. During the examination the patient is asked to be seated, the affected arm is then adducted and the elbow is bent to 90 degrees. Slow and cautious passive lateral and/or medial rotations have the effect of being able to visualize different sections of the shoulder. In order to also demonstrate those parts which are hidden under the acromion in the neutral position, a maximum medial rotation with hyperextension behind the back is required.

To avoid the different tendon echogenicities caused by different instrument settings, Middleton compared the tendon’s echogenicity with that of the deltoid muscle, which is still lege artis.

Usually the echogenicity compared to the deltoid muscle is homogeneous intensified without dorsal echo extinction. Variability with reduced or intensified echo has also been found in healthy tendons. Bilateral comparison is very helpful when distinguishing and setting boundaries between physiological variants and a possible pathological finding. Degenerative changes at the rotator cuff often are found on both sides of the body. Consequently, unilateral differences rather point to a pathological source and bilateral changes rather to a physiological variation.

In addition, a dynamic examination can help to differentiate between an ultrasound artifact and a real pathology.

To accurately evaluate the echogenicity of an ultrasound, one has to take into account the physical laws of reflection, absorption and dispersion. It is at all times important to acknowledge that the structures in the joint of the shoulder are not aligned in the transversal, coronal or sagittal plane, and that therefore during imaging of the shoulder the transducer head has to be held perpendicularly or parallel to the structures of interest. Otherwise the appearing echogenicity may not be evaluated.

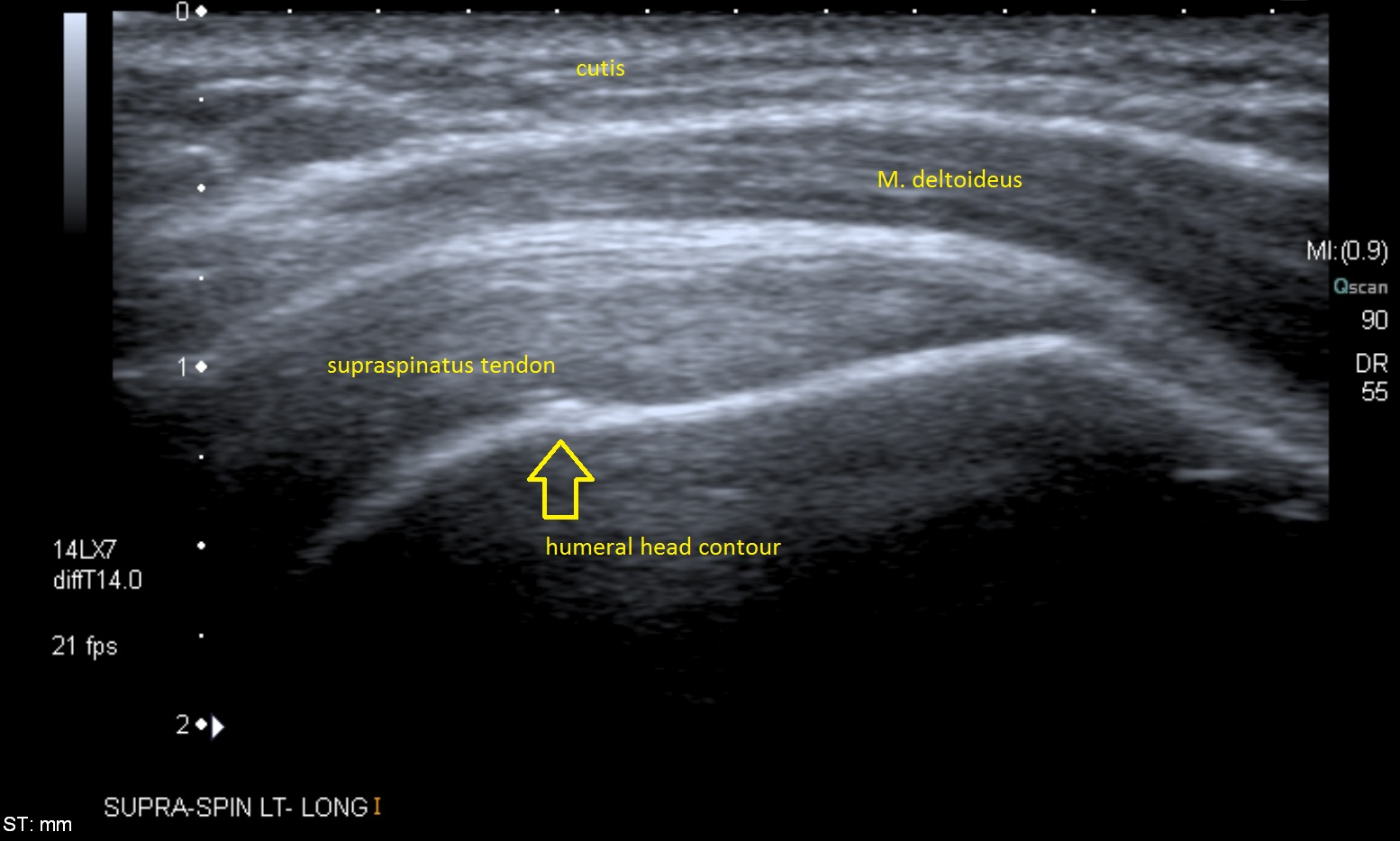
Longitudinal ultra sonography of the supraspinatus tendon

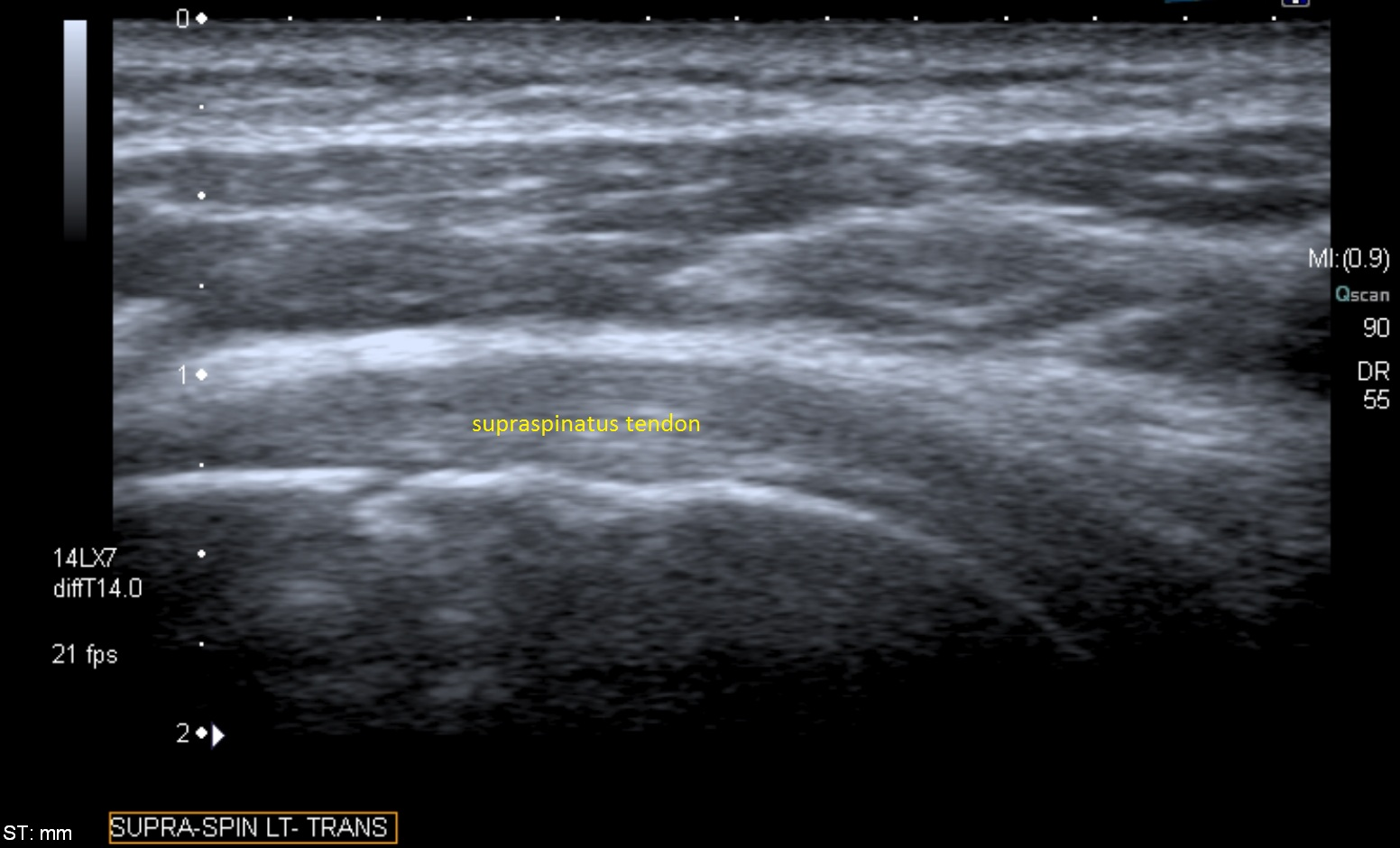
Transversal ultra sonography of the supraspinatus tendon

==== MRI ====
Orthopedics established the MRI early on as the tool of choice for joint- and soft tissue-imaging because of its non-invasiveness, lack of radiation exposure, multi planar slicing possibilities and the high soft tissue contrast.

MRIs can provide joint details to the treating orthopedist, helping them to diagnose and decide the next appropriate therapeutic step. To examine the shoulder, the patient should lay down with the concerned arm is in lateral rotation. For signal detection it is recommended to use a surface-coil. To find pathologies of the rotator cuff in the basic diagnostic investigation, T2-weighted sequences with fat-suppression or STIR sequences have proven value. In general, the examination should occur in the following three main planes: axial, oblique coronal and sagittal.

Most morphological changes and injuries are sustained to the supraspinatus tendon. Traumatic rotator cuff changes are often located antero-superior, meanwhile degenerative changes more likely are supero-posterior.
Tendons are predominantly composed of dense collagen fiber bundles. Because of their extreme short T2-relaxation time they appear typically signal-weak, respectively, dark. Degenerative changes, inflammations and also partial and complete tears cause loss of the original tendon structure. Fatty deposits, mucous degeneration and hemorrhages lead to an increased intratendinal T1-image. Edema formations, inflammatory changes and ruptures increase the signals in a T2-weighted image.

==== MRA ====
While using MRI, true lesions at the rotator interval region between the parts of the supraspinatus and subscapularis are all but impossible to distinguish from normal synovium and capsule.

In 1999, Weishaupt D. et al. reached through two readers a significant better visibility of pulley lesions at the rotator interval and the expected location of the reflection pulley of the long biceps and subscapularis tendon on parasagittal (reader1/reader2 sensitivity: 86%/100%; specificity: 90%/70%) and axial (reader1/reader2 sensitivity: 86%/93%; specificity: 90%/80%) MRA images.

When examining the rotator cuff, the MRA has a couple of advantages compared to the native MRI. Through a fat suppressed T2-weighted spin echo, MRA can reproduce an extreme high fat-water-contrast, which helps to detect water-deposits with better damage diagnosis in structurally changed collagen fiber bundles.

== Other animals ==
Tetrapod forelimbs are characterised by a high degree of mobility in the shoulder-thorax connection. Lacking a solid skeletal connection between the shoulder girdle and the vertebral column, the forelimb's attachment to the trunk is instead mainly controlled by serratus lateralis and levator scapulae. Depending on locomotor style, a bone connects the shoulder girdle to the trunk in some animals; the coracoid bone in reptiles and birds, and the clavicle in primates and bats.

In primates, the shoulder shows characteristics that differ from other mammals, including a well developed clavicle, a dorsally shifted scapula with prominent acromion and spine, and a humerus featuring a straight shaft and a spherical head.

In terms of comparative anatomy the human scapula represents two bones that have become fused together; the (dorsal) scapula proper and the (ventral) coracoid. The epiphyseal line across the glenoid cavity is the line of fusion. They are the counterparts of the ilium and ischium of the pelvic girdle.

— R. J. Last, Last's Anatomy

== Additional images ==
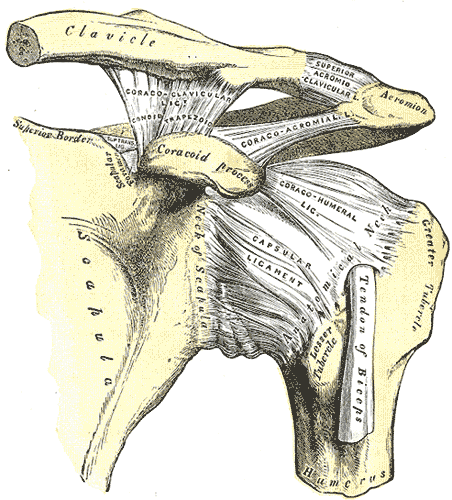
The left shoulder and acromioclavicular joints, and the proper ligaments of the scapula

== See also ==
- Shoulder girdle (Pectoral girdle)
- Sternoclavicular joint
- Chip on shoulder
- Ambe
- Milwaukee shoulder syndrome
