= Manipulation under anesthesia =

Alternative therapy to treat chronic pain and break scar tissue

- fibrosis release

Alternative therapy
- Claims: improving articular and soft tissue movement

Manipulation under anesthesia (MUA) or fibrosis release procedures is an alternative physical therapy technique. It involves putting the patient under sedation, and then performing a combination of controlled joint mobilization/manipulation and myofascial release techniques. Sedation allows otherwise painful procedures to be performed smoothly. MUA is intended to break up excessive adhesions (scar tissue) that builds up after orthopedic surgery: the idea is that by breaking up scar tissue impeding the movement of soft tissue and joints, optimal range of motion can be recovered. It has been also used to treat chronic pain which has been unmanageable by other methods.

The patient normally goes through a series of examinations, including imaging tests and laboratory work, prior to MUA. These tests are necessary to identify the targeted area and to ensure the patient will benefit from the procedure. MUA can be performed by many different types of medical professionals, although they must have studied MUA and received certification in the technique.

MUA is used by osteopathic/orthopedic physicians, chiropractors and MUA certified physicians. It aims to break up adhesions on and around spinal joints as the cervical, thoracic, lumbar, sacral, and pelvic regions, or extremity joints as the knee, shoulder and hip. A restricted range of motion in these joints can be painful and limit function. Failed attempts at other standard conservative treatment methods (i.e., manipulation, physical therapy, or medication) over a sufficient time-frame is one of the principal patient qualifiers.

== Procedure ==
=== Intravenous (IV) infusion ===
Sodium pentothal was the first anesthetizing agent used with the MUA procedure. That was followed by propofol, which was used to induce a "twilight state" (aka, IV sedation or conscious sedation). The latter became the doctor-preferred means of rendering the service, as it offered preservation of patient responsiveness during the delivery of treatment. With today's MUA procedure, deep conscious sedation is accomplished with agents such as propofol through monitored anesthesia care (MAC).

=== Local injection ===
As a less common mode of MUA treatment, select injectable medications can be administered directly into affected synovial joints, spinal facet joints, or into the surrounding epidural space.

== History ==
Medication-assisted manipulation (MAM) has been used since the 1930s, and MUA was practiced by osteopathic physicians and orthopedic surgeons in the 1940s and 1950s. It was largely abandoned due to complications from general anesthesia and due to the type of nonspecific manipulation procedures used. It was modified and revived in the 1990s, primarily by chiropractors, and also by osteopathic physicians; this was likely due to safer anesthesia used for conscious sedation, along with increased interest in spinal manipulation (SM).

In the MUA literature, spinal manipulation under anesthesia has been described as a controversial procedure. It has a history of enthusiastic claims of success and indiscriminate use. With continued misconceptions about the findings and significance of primary research, similar issues remain today.

=== Some historical misconceptions about the findings of spinal MUA research ===
Author/s cited	Commonly reported outcomes/claims	Actual data and relevant study methods, as reported by publication
Bradford and Siehl	71% of 723 MUA patients had good results (return to normal activity relatively symptom free) and 25.3% had fair results (return to normal activity with slight residuals)	Overall, for 723 cases (666 different patients), 60% had good results, 30% had fair results, and 10% had poor results. Most patients received a single procedure dose. As for the 185 patients who had a herniated disc, 26.4% had good results and 44.3% had fair results, with the author reporting, "improvement was quite temporary in a number of cases, since 51% required subsequent operation."
Chrisman, et al.	51% of patients reported good to excellent results three years post MUA	51% of 39 patients had good or excellent results after rotatory manipulation of the spine under anesthesia. Of patients with positive myelograms, 37% (10 of 27) had good to excellent results three years or more after manipulation. All patients received a single procedure dose.
Krumhansl and Nowacek	Of 171 patients receiving MUA, 25% had no pain, 50% were much improved (with pain markedly decreased), and 20% were better and could tolerate their pain (but it interfered with work and recreation)	Of 171 patients, most of whom received a single procedure dose, approximately 25% were "cured" (having no pain of the type experienced prior to MUA), 50% were "much improved" (with markedly diminished pain and function restored but with intermittent nuisance type pain with weather changes or strenuous activity) and 20% were "better, but" (having a tolerable pain level but remained dysfunctional for work and recreational activities).
Kuo and Loh	83% of 517 patients treated with MUA responded well	Of 517 patients receiving manipulation, 76.8% had satisfactory results. However, the number of patients anesthetized during manipulation is not reported (if any). In general terms, the authors state, "Prior to manipulation, general anesthesia with intravenous thiopental sodium may be given to suppress pain and muscle spasm." Seventy-three patients (14%) had a condition recurrence or relapse, ranging from 2 months to 12 years after the first series of manipulations. Unresponsive patients (9%, overall) underwent surgical exploration and received a second series of manipulations after revision of the treatment protocol such that 434 of 517 patients (83.9%) are reported as having responded well to manipulation.
Mensor	83% of 600 patients with EMG-verified radiculopathies reported significant improvement following MUA	For over 600 patients treated, a cursory evaluation led the author to "believe that the percentage of success or failure has not changed materially" from the original report. The original report cited excellent to good results in 64% of private patients and 45% of industrial accident patients with disabilities. Overall, 83% of patients received a single procedure dose, with the author reporting, "repeated manipulation is not justified" for satisfactory results. Within neither paper is EMG testing mentioned as part of the patient's objective findings or as a qualifier for treatment.
Ongley, et al.	Patients that had back pain for a minimum of 10 years reported an 87% recovery rate after MUA	Eighty-one patients had an average pain duration of 10 years. Patients in the experimental group were placed in a diazepam-induced amnesic state, and received manipulation after administration of local anesthetic to six different ligaments of the lumbar, lumbopelvic, and sacroiliac regions. At six months, of the 40 patients in the experimental group who received a single procedure dose, 87.5% had greater than 50% improvement in disability scores and 37.5% had recovered completely ("free from disability").

== State of evidence ==
=== Spinal MUA ===
Since the 1930s, spinal manipulation under anesthesia has been reported in published medical literature. Some reports contain positive results. However, as part of the evolution of the procedure, there are many variations in the sedatives/medications, manipulation technique, number of MUA sessions, time between procedure doses (if administered in series), and application of post-MUA adjunctive and rehabilitative measures used.

There is a strong theoretical basis for spinal MUA. However, due to the variety in existing published studies, field practitioners have not had an objective and uniform means by which to establish evidence-based treatment protocols. Long-term effectiveness of MUA in the management of specific spinal conditions has yet to be investigated, as the preponderance of studies is of lower level evidence. Another area where basic experimental research is lacking to support the efficacy of MUA treatment for the lower back and other spinal regions involves two prevailing theories. The first suggests that reducing adhesions may increase spinal flexibility, while the second proposes that MUA is more effective at treating adhesions than office-based manual therapy methods. The circumstances under which, or the frequency with which, spinal adhesions may form in the general population regardless of prior surgery or vertebral fracture have not been addressed in the medical literature.

A 2005 consensus statement from the American Academy of Osteopathy indicates that research and publication on the use and effectiveness of MUA is limited. It has also been reported that there are gaps in the medical literature for spinal MUA in the areas of patient selection and treatment protocols. Thus, a Delphi process was undertaken to develop evidence-informed and consensus-based guidelines for the chiropractic profession, which produced directions for MUA practitioners and facilities.

Notably, the criteria recommended by members of the chiropractic profession are distinctly different from the criteria established by the American Academy of Osteopathy. Moreover, the Delphi method is a consensus process which represents consenting opinion from an impaneled group of experts. But with expert opinion serving as the lowest level of evidence (Level V) in the medical evidence hierarchy, the MUA-related Delphi process publication of 2014 does not enhance the state of the evidence for spinal MUA. Therefore, the largely anecdotal basis for procedural effectiveness, and continued reliance upon the spinal MUA protocols historically used, are what principally influence the practice of MUA today.

In comparison to other available treatment options for chronic spine pain patients, it is the benchmark of the randomized controlled trial that would most accurately define patient candidacy, optimal procedure dosing, and long-term effectiveness for MUA. Previous MUA investigators have mentioned the use of inconsistent protocols and have called for large-scale MUA studies (randomized trials) for chronic low back pain. As of 2013, no such studies have been undertaken.

Due to the lack of high-level research evidence for the long-term clinical efficacy of spinal MUA, several traditional criteria for patient selection are without support or remain unproven. The most recent analysis of the published medical evidence for MUA shows that disc herniation/protrusion qualifies as at least a relative contraindication, with risk for injury and no proven long-term benefit. Also, in the presence of a positive lumbar EMG study (nerve root compression) with lumbar disc herniation, Level II evidence suggests that patients will eventually need surgical correction. For chronic neck and low back pain patients who also have significant anxiety/stress, Level II evidence suggests that MUA will not be of therapeutic benefit. Accordingly, most insurance carriers in the United States maintain a medical policy which deems the spinal MUA unproven or experimental/investigational.

=== Extremity joint MUA ===
Patients that may qualify for MUA to an extremity joint include those with stiff post-operative knee joints that have undergone total knee replacement (total knee arthroplasty - TKA). Range of motion data taken at discharge following TKA have been suggested as an indicator for MUA, when falling short of the "optimal zone" of ≥70˚ flexion combined with an extension deficit of ≤10˚. It appears that the ideal period for applying manipulation to knee stiffness after TKA is at less than 20 weeks from primary surgery, with no added benefit reported from re-manipulations. Similarly, another recent study also found that MUA is useful for decreased range of motion but the success rate of repeated MUA was less than that of the primary dose.

Outside of the above clinical scenario and related research, the supportive evidence for MUA to other extremity joints is weak, inconclusive or non-existent. The shoulder, when failing to achieve flexibility following standard treatment, is one of the extremity regions for which the frozen shoulder condition has traditionally been cited as an indication for MUA. There are some supportive studies in this area, including one showing that patients fare better with intervention at 6 and 9 months after condition onset (having significantly better abduction and external rotation, with less pain at rest and at night). However, for those studies which represent the highest level of research evidence, the results of two recent systematic reviews for frozen shoulder raise question as to treatment superiority when compared to other forms of treatment. Namely, in their 2012 systematic review, Maund, et al. found a single adequate study, but no evidence there of better outcome with MUA versus home exercise. In their 2015 systematic review, Uppal, et al. determined MUA to be equivocal at best, when compared to hydrodilation and steroid injection.

The provision of MUA to an extremity joint is reserved for primary conditions thereof, such as a frozen articulation. The practice of applying MUA to an extremity joint that conjoins the spine (i.e., shoulder and/or hip), as a routine component or an extension of a spinal MUA procedure, is not supported by clinical investigation.

== Risk ==
Tens of thousands of uneventful spinal and extremity MUA procedures have been performed in the United States over the past several decades. As such, in all likelihood, the risks with the procedure are relatively low or minimized with current techniques and when patients are properly selected and evaluated by the anaesthesiologist, the medical physician who is providing medical clearance, and the MUA manual therapy practitioner (DC, DO, MD). However, as with any procedure, there are inherent risks with MUA. The chiropractic literature seems to best address concern for complications, poor outcomes, or adverse events with spinal MUA; however, better event reporting is needed to develop more definitive risk criteria. In part, these complications include severe sacroiliac pain with transient "pain paralysis" (of one or both legs), transient respiratory distress, a significant adverse cardiovascular event, spinal fracture with hemothorax, lower extremity fracture, glenoid fracture, shoulder dislocation, and pseudoaneurysm.
