= Ambe =

Superficial jutting out of a bone

An ambe, in anatomy, is a superficial jutting out of a bone.

Ambe is also the name of an old surgical instrument, made famous by Hippocrates, for reducing dislocations of the shoulder, so called because its extremity projects like the prominence of a rock. It was described in the Philosophical Transactions of the Royal Society as making a sufficient extension and counter-extension to guide the dislocated bone back into joint.
