= Coracohumeral ligament =

Ligament of the shoulder

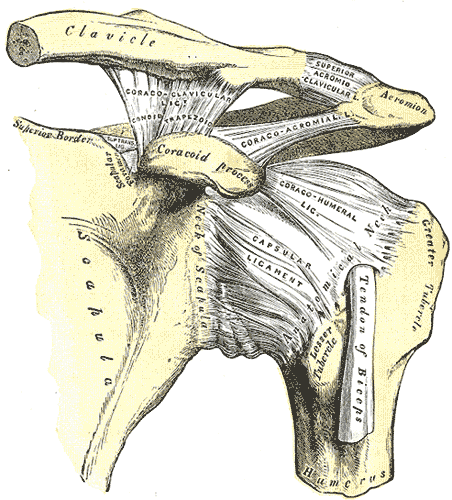
- The left shoulder and acromioclavicular joints, and the proper ligaments of the scapula. (Coracohumeral visible at center right.)

Details
- From: Coracoid process (scapula)
- To: Greater tubercle of humerus

Identifiers
- Latin: ligamentum coracohumerale
- TA98: A03.5.08.004
- TA2: 1770
- FMA: 34951

The coracohumeral ligament is a broad ligament of the shoulder. It attaches to the coracoid process at one end, and to the greater and lesser tubercles of the humerus at the other (as two discrete bands). It strengthens the upper part of the joint capsule of the shoulder joint.

== Anatomy ==
The coracohumeral ligament arises from the lateral border or the base of the coracoid process. It passes obliquely downwards and laterally to the front of the greater tubercle of the humerus.

It forms two bands - an anterior one and a posterior one - that insert into the lesser and greater tubercles of the humerus, respectively.

The two bands of the CCL blend with the joint capsule; the ligament is intimately united with the capsule by its posterior and inferior border, but its anterior and superior border presents a free edge which overlaps the capsule. The CCL also blends with the tendon of the supraspinatus muscle, and the subscapularis muscle.

=== Anatomical relations ===
The CCL is situated superior to the head of the humerus.

== Function ==
The coracohumeral ligament strengthens the upper part of the shoulder joint capsule. It becomes taut with external rotation of the glenohumeral joint.

== Clinical significance ==
The coracohumeral ligament may be viewed using ultrasound of the shoulder.

== See also ==
- Glenohumeral ligaments
- Coraco-acromial ligament
- Acromioclavicular ligament
