= Scaption =

Scaption is an abbreviation for scapular plane elevation. The term does not denote whether the elevation is with an internal, external or neutral rotation. The term is widely used in sports training, occupational therapy, and physical therapy.

It is the movement of the arm in the plane between flexion and abduction of the arm.
