= Acromioclavicular ligament =

Ligament of the shoulder girdle

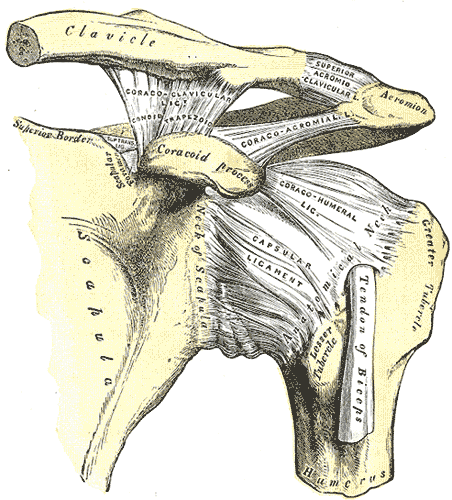
- The left shoulder including the acromioclavicular joint and the proper ligaments of the scapula.

Details
- From: Acromion
- To: Clavicle

Identifiers
- Latin: ligamentum acromioclaviculare
- TA98: A03.5.03.002
- TA2: 1745
- FMA: 26026

The acromioclavicular ligament is part of the acromioclavicular joint. It is divided into two parts: superior and inferior.

== Superior acromioclavicular ligament ==
This ligament is a quadrilateral band, covering the superior part of the articulation, and extending between the upper part of the lateral end of the clavicle and the adjoining part of the upper surface of the acromion.

It is composed of parallel fibers, which interlace with the aponeuroses of the trapezius and deltoideus; below, it is in contact with the articular disk when this is present.

This ligament provides horizontal stability to the acromioclavicular joint

== Inferior acromioclavicular ligament ==
This ligament is somewhat thinner than the preceding; it covers the under part of the articulation, and is attached to the adjoining surfaces of the two bones.

It is in relation, above, in rare cases with the articular disk; below, with the tendon of the supraspinatus.
