= Joint capsule =

Anatomical structure on synovial joints

- Typical joint

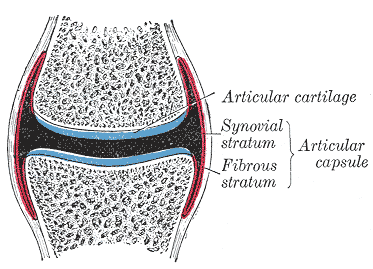
- Diagrammatic section of a diarthrodial joint.

Details

Identifiers
- Latin: capsula articularis
- MeSH: D017746
- TA98: A03.0.00.026
- TA2: 1536
- FMA: 34836

In anatomy, a joint capsule or articular capsule is an envelope surrounding a synovial joint. Each joint capsule has two parts: an outer fibrous layer or membrane, and an inner synovial layer or membrane.

== Membranes ==
Each capsule consists of two layers or membranes:

- an outer (fibrous membrane, fibrous stratum) composed of avascular white fibrous tissue
- an inner (synovial membrane, synovial stratum) which is a secreting layer

On the inside of the capsule, articular cartilage covers the end surfaces of the bones that articulate within that joint.

The outer layer is highly innervated by the same nerves which perforate through the adjacent muscles associated with the joint.

== Fibrous membrane ==
The fibrous membrane of the joint capsule is attached to the whole circumference of the articular end of each bone entering into the joint, and thus entirely surrounds the articulation. It is made up of dense connective tissue. It's a long spongy tissue.

== Clinical significance ==
Frozen shoulder (adhesive capsulitis) is a disorder in which the shoulder capsule becomes inflamed.

Plica syndrome is a disorder in which the synovial plica becomes inflamed and causes abnormal biomechanics in the knee.

== Gallery ==
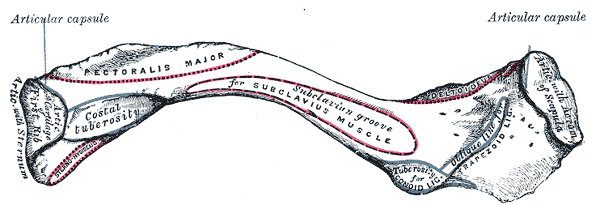
Left clavicle. Inferior surface.

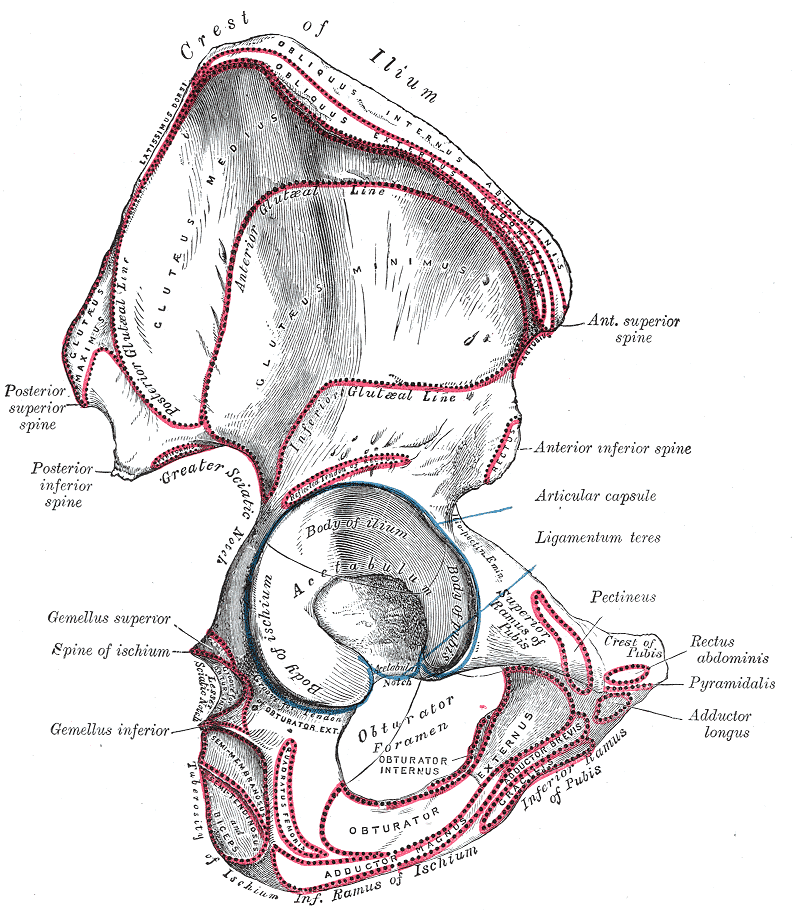
Right hip bone. External surface.

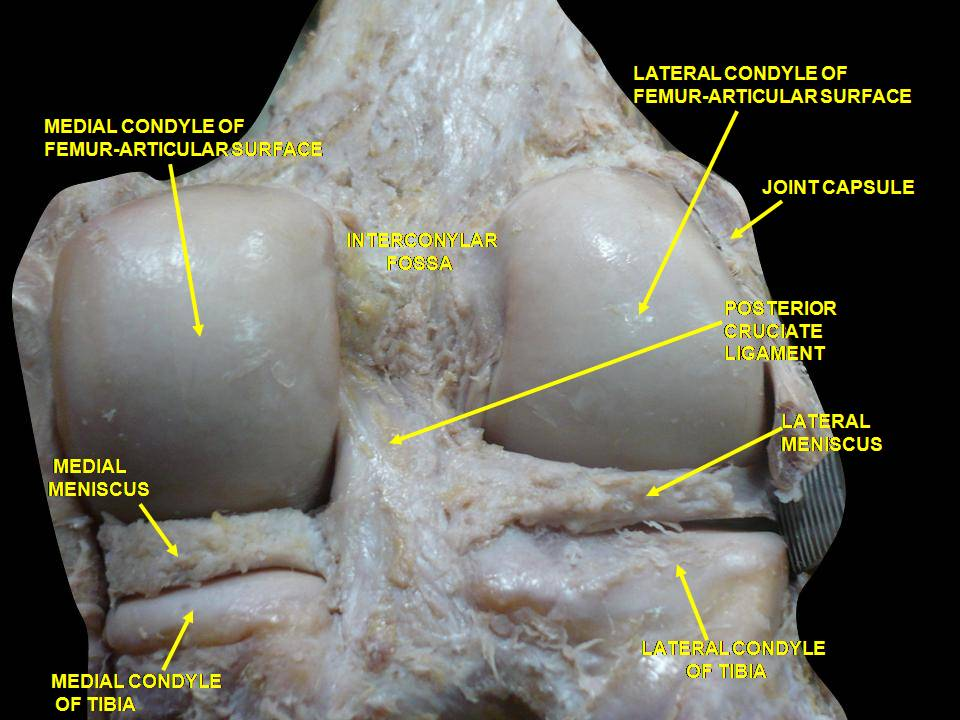
Right knee in extension. Deep dissection. Posterior view.

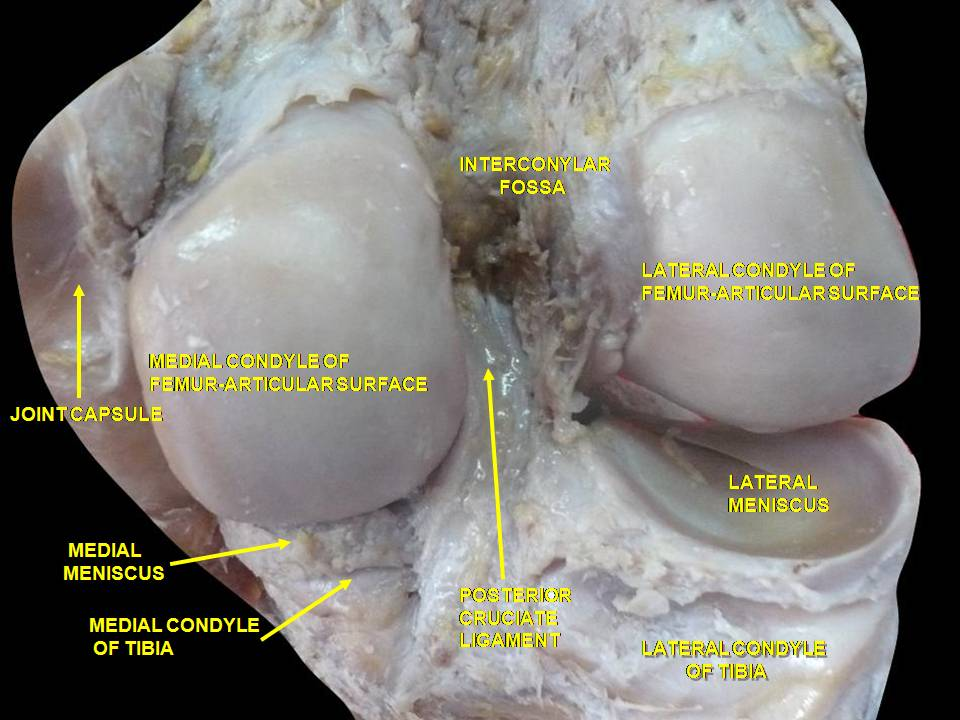
Right knee in extension. Deep dissection. Posterior view.

== See also ==
- Articular capsule of the humerus
- Articular capsule of the knee joint
- Atlanto-axial joint
- Capsule of atlantooccipital articulation
- Capsule of hip joint
- Capsule of temporomandibular joint
