= Shoulder surgery =

Surgery of injured shoulders

- ICD-9-CM: 81.80-81.83, 81.23
- [edit on Wikidata]

Shoulder surgery is a means of treating injured shoulders. Many surgeries have been developed to repair the muscles, connective tissue, or damaged joints that can arise from traumatic or overuse injuries to the shoulder.

== Dislocated shoulder ==
A dislocated shoulder can be treated with:

- arthroscopic repairs
- repair of the glenoid labrum (anterior or posterior)

In some cases, arthroscopic surgery is not enough to fix the injured shoulder. When the shoulder dislocates too many times and is worn down, the ball and socket are not lined up correctly. The socket is worn down and the ball will never sit in it the same. After many dislocations the shoulder bones will begin to wear down and chip away. When this occurs, another operation must be done.

Coracoid of left scapula

The operation is called the Latarjet surgery. The procedure involves transfer of the coracoid with its attached muscles to the deficient area over the front of the glenoid. This replaces the missing bone and the transferred muscle also acts as an additional muscular strut preventing further dislocations. It is an open surgery and requires an overnight hospital stay and usually a 4-6 month recovery.

The recovery depends upon many factors, including where the tear was located, how severe it was, and how good the surgical repair was.

It is believed that it takes at least four to six weeks for the labrum to re-attach itself to the scapula bone (shoulder blade), and probably another four to six weeks to get strong. The labrum is a ring of cartilage on the rim of a shallow socket in the scapula into which the head of the upper arm bone normally fits and rotates.

Once the labrum has healed to the rim of the shoulder blade, it should see stress very gradually so that it can gather strength. It is important that it is not re-injured while healing. How much motion and strengthening of the arm is allowed after surgery also depends upon many factors, and it is up to the surgeon to let the patient know their limitations and how fast to progress.

Because of the variability in the injury and the type of repair done, it is difficult to predict how soon someone can to return to activities and to sports after the repair. The type of sport also is important, since contact sports have a greater chance of injuring the labrum repair. However, a vast majority of patients have full function of the shoulder after labrum repair, and most patients can return to their previous level of sports with no or few restrictions.

- repair of the capsular ligaments (Bankart repair)
- repair of the biceps long head anchor or SLAP lesion
- tightening of the shoulder capsule (capsulorrhaphy or capsular shift)
- open repairs (for dislocations with fractures, etc.)
- biceps tenodesis surgery

Surgical treatment of the shoulder due to potential biceps tendonitis or a tear of the labrum otherwise known as a SLAP tear. The long head of the biceps passes through the shoulder joint and attaches to the labrum. During a biceps tenodesis procedure, the surgeon cuts the attachment of the biceps tendon from the labrum and reattaches it to the humerus bone by tacks. By doing this, pressure is relieved from the labrum significantly reducing pain. This surgery is performed to alleviate biceps inflammation and can be implemented in correspondence to a SLAP lesion surgery. Recovery is approximately 4–8 months depending on the individual and requires physical therapy.

== Separated shoulder ==
A separated shoulder can be treated with:

- Weaver–Dunn procedure
- Weaver–Dunn with various additional fixations (sutures, suture anchors, tendon autograft) to replace the coracoclavicular ligaments. Note: various methods have been utilized to anchor the clavicle in place while the surgery heals. This includes
  - Dacron graft/loop
  - Bosworth screw
  - Kirschner wires
  - Hook plate
- Anatomic repair, or any repair using tendon allograft without sacrificing the coracoacromial ligament.
- Arthroscopic Weaver–Dunn
- Transfer of conjoined tendon and distal end of coracoid process to the clavicle

== Sternoclavicular separation ==
Sternoclavicular separation can be treated.

== Tendinitis, bursitis, and impingement syndrome ==
The rotator cuff can cause pain in many different ways including tendonitis, bursitis, calcific tendonitis, partial thickness tears, full thickness tears or mechanical impingement. Tendinitis, bursitis, and impingement syndrome can be treated with tendon repair and the Mumford procedure or acromioplasty.

== Rotator cuff tear ==
A rotator cuff tear can be treated with arthroscopic rotator cuff repair.

== Fracture ==
A shoulder fracture can be treated with open reduction internal fixation (ORIF).

== Arthritis of the shoulder (glenohumeral joint) ==
Arthritis of the shoulder can be treated with total shoulder replacement, hemiarthroplasty (half a replacement), or a reverse shoulder implant (for arthritis with large rotator cuff tear).

== Arthritis or osteolysis of the acromioclavicular joint ==
Arthritis or osteolysis of the acromioclavicular joint can be treated with the Mumford procedure (open or arthroscopic).

== Scapular winging ==
Scapular winging due to serratus anterior muscle (long thoracic nerve) palsy can be treated with a pectoralis major transfer.

Scapular winging due to trapezius muscle (spinal accessory nerve) palsy can be treated with an Eden–Lange procedure.

Scapular winging due to facioscapulohumeral muscular dystrophy can be treated with a scapulopexy or scapulothoracic fusion.

== See also ==
- Shoulder problem
- Separated shoulder
- Clavicle fracture
- Arthroscopy
- Arthritis
- Capsule of the glenohumeral joint (shoulder joint)
- Glenoid cavity
- Glenoid labrum
- Snapping scapula syndrome
