= Separated shoulder =

- Other names: Acromioclavicular joint injury, acromioclavicular separation, AC joint separation, AC separation
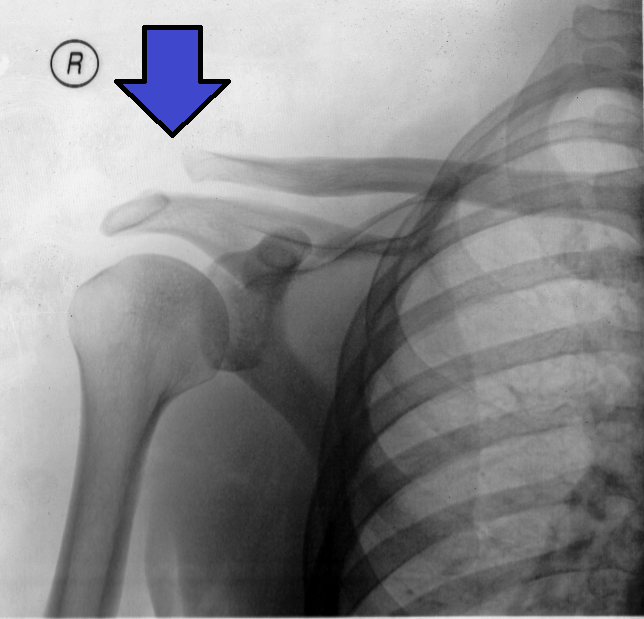
- An Xray showing a separated shoulder. Notice the separation between the end of the collarbone and the scapula.
- Specialty: Orthopedics, emergency medicine
- Symptoms: Pain, deformity, decreased range of motion
- Types: Type I, II, III, IV, V, VI
- Causes: Trauma such as a fall
- Risk factors: Contact sports
- Diagnostic method: Examination, X-rays
- Differential diagnosis: Dislocated shoulder, clavicle fracture
- Treatment: Type I and II: Sling and pain medication Type III: Conservative management and surgery if still symptoms Type IV, V, VI: Surgery
- Frequency: Relatively common

A separated shoulder, also known as acromioclavicular joint injury, is a common injury to the acromioclavicular joint. The AC joint is located at the outer end of the clavicle where it attaches to the acromion of the scapula. Symptoms include non-radiating pain which may make it difficult to move the shoulder. The presence of swelling or bruising and a deformity in the shoulder is also common depending on how severe the dislocation is.

It is most commonly due to a fall onto the front and upper part of the shoulder when the arm is by the side. They are classified as type I, II, III, IV, V, or VI with the higher the number the more severe the injury. Diagnosis is typically based on physical examination and X-rays. In type I and II injuries there is minimal deformity while in a type III injury the deformity resolves upon lifting the arm upwards. In type IV, V, and VI the deformity does not resolve with lifting the arm.

Generally types I and II are treated without surgery, while type III may be treated with or without surgery, and types IV, V, and VI are treated with surgery. For type I and II treatment is usually with a sling and pain medications for a week or two. In type III injuries surgery is generally only done if symptoms remain following treatment without surgery.

A separated shoulder is a common injury among those involved in sports, especially contact sports. It makes up about half of shoulder injuries among those who play hockey, football, and rugby. Those affected are typically 20 to 30 years old. Males are more often affected than females. The injury was initially classified in 1967 with the current classification from 1984.

== Cause ==
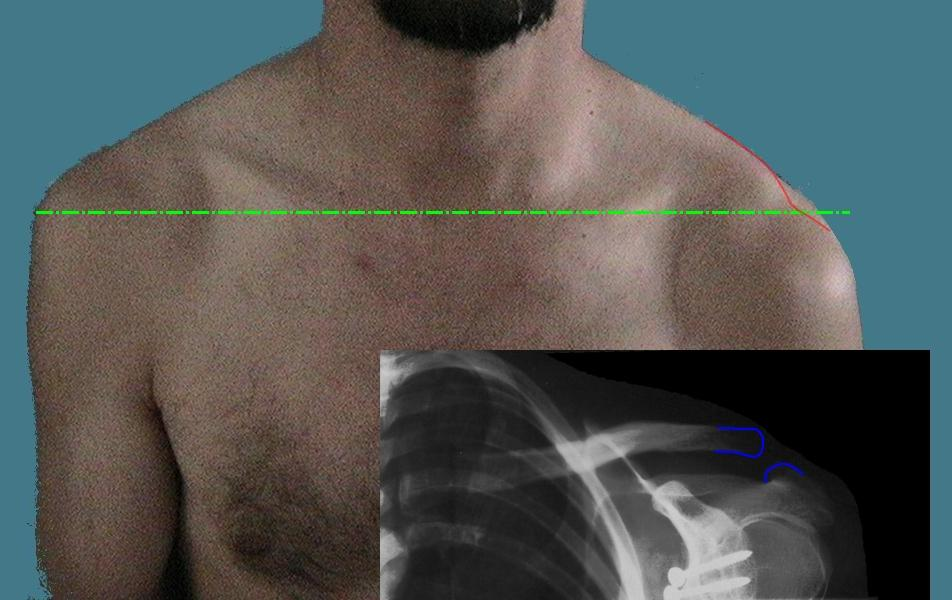
Acromion-clavicle disjunction (left shoulder) — note that the shoulder is lower and the "piano key"; the scar on the photograph and the screws on the radiography are ostheosynthesis material from a former trauma repair, without any connection with the present trauma.

Separated shoulders often occur in people who participate in sports such as football, soccer, horseback riding, hockey, lacrosse, parkour, combat sports, rowing, rugby, snowboarding, skateboarding, crack the whip, cycling, roller derby and wrestling. The separation is classified into 6 types, with 1 through 3 increasing in severity, and 4 through 6 being the most severe. The most common mechanism of injury is a fall on the tip of the shoulder or also a fall on an outstretched hand. In falls where the force is transmitted indirectly, often only the acromioclavicular ligament is affected, and the coracoclavicular ligaments remain unharmed. In ice hockey, the separation is sometimes due to a lateral force, as when one gets forcefully checked into the side of the rink.

== Mechanism ==
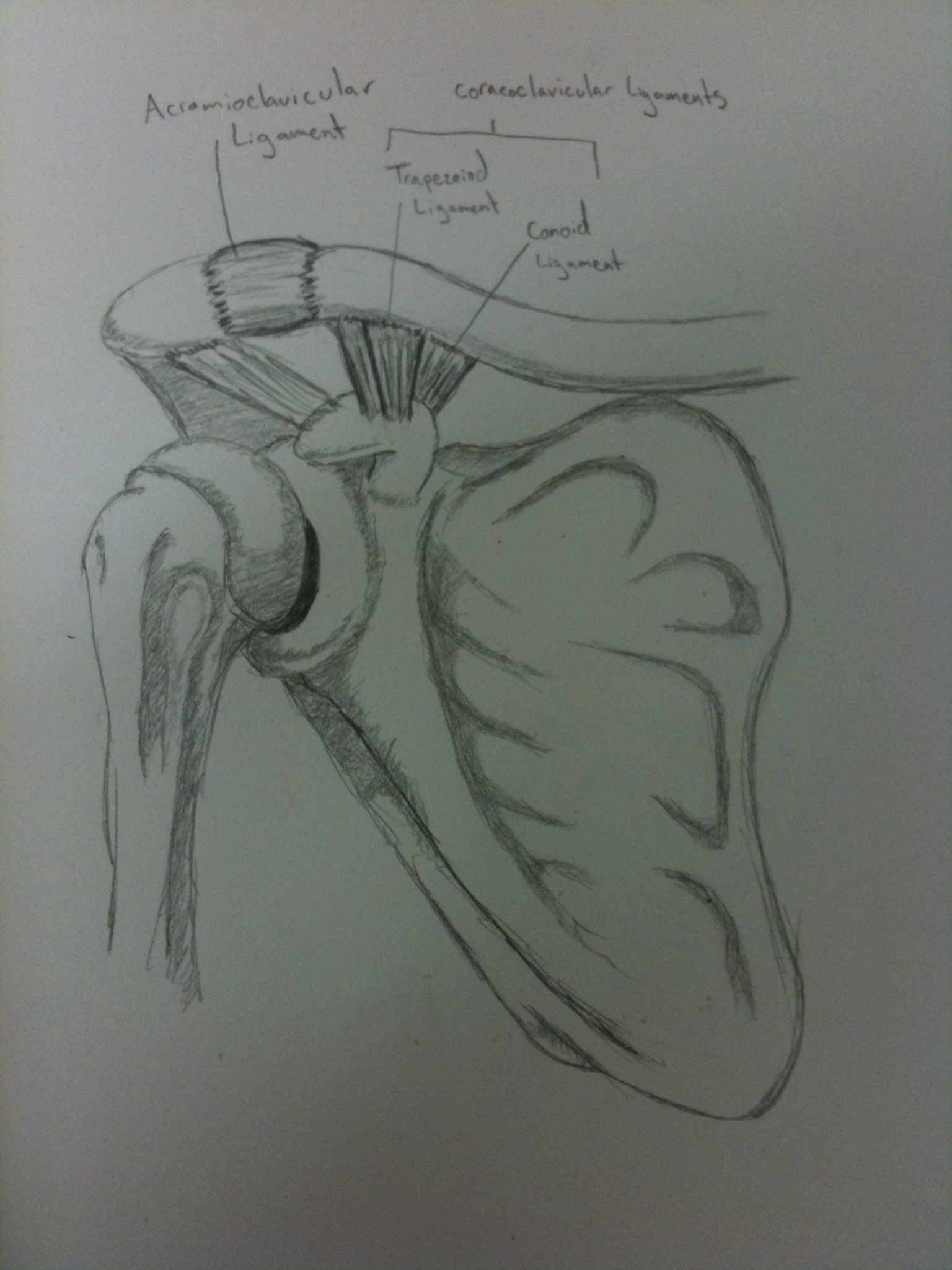
Right shoulder with AC ligaments

The acromion of the scapula is connected to the clavicle by the superior acromioclavicular ligament. The coracoclavicular ligaments connect the clavicle to the coracoid process. The two ligaments that form the coracoclavicular ligaments are the trapezoid and conoid ligaments. These three ligaments add support to the shoulder joint.

There are four types of soft tissue disruptions that may cause acromioclavicular separation:

- The conoid and trapezoid ligaments may tear at any location
- The lateral clavicle may ride upward after being avulsed from its periosteum
- The acromioclavicular ligaments may be torn
- The conoid-trapezoid ligament origin may avulse from the coracoid

== Diagnosis ==
Diagnosis is based on physical examination and an x-ray. A physical examination can identify point tenderness, pain at the AC joint with cross-arm adduction, and pain relief with an injection of a local anesthetic. The cross-arm adduction will produce pain specifically at the AC joint and will be done by elevating the arm to a 90° angle, flexing the elbow to a 90° angle, and adducting the arm across the chest. The pain in the shoulder is hard to pinpoint due to the shared innervation of the AC joint and the glenohumeral joint. An injury to the AC joint will result in pain over the AC joint, in the anterolateral neck and in the region in the anterolateral deltoid.

X-ray indicates a separated shoulder when the acromioclavicular joint space is widened (it is normally 5 to 8 mm).

It can be classified into 6 types.

=== Type I ===
A Type I AC separation involves direct trauma to the shoulder causing the injury to ligaments that form the joint, but no severe tearing or fracture. It is commonly referred to as a sprain. For a type 1 AC separation, the joint does not lose stability.

=== Type II ===
A Type II AC separation involves complete tearing of the acromioclavicular ligament, as well as a partial tear (but not a full tear) of the coracoclavicular ligaments. This often causes a noticeable bump on the shoulder and partial or incomplete dislocation. This bump is permanent. The clavicle is unstable to direct stress examination. On radiographs, the lateral end of the clavicle may be slightly elevated by pressing on the sternal aspect of the clavicle forcing the acromial end down, and by releasing, it may pop back up eliciting a piano key sign due to the tearing of the AC.

=== Type III ===
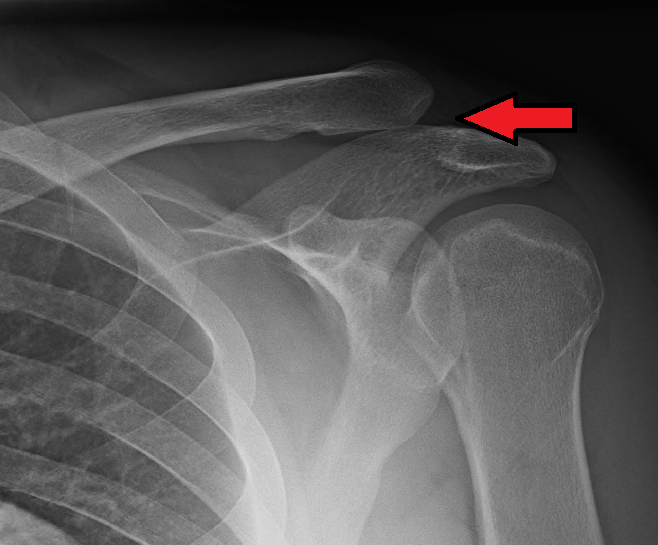
Type 3 AC joint separation on plain X ray

In a Type III AC separation both acromioclavicular and coracoclavicular ligaments are torn without significant disruption of the deltoid or trapezial fascia. A significant bump, resulting in some shoulder deformity, is formed by the lateral end of the clavicle. This bump, caused by the clavicle's dislocation, is permanent. The clavicle can be moved in and out of place on the shoulder. A radiographic examination will show the results as abnormal.

=== Type IV ===
This is a type III injury with avulsion of the coracoclavicular ligament from the clavicle, with the distal clavicle displaced posteriorly into or through the trapezius and may tent the posterior skin. A displaced clavicle is easily seen on a radiograph. It is important to evaluate the sternoclavicular joint also, because there can be an anterior dislocation of the sternoclavicular joint and posterior dislocation of the AC joint. This injury is generally acknowledged to require surgery.

=== Type V ===
This is a more severe form of a type III injury, with the trapezial and deltoid fascia stripped off of the acromion as well as the clavicle. This is type III but with exaggeration of the vertical displacement of the clavicle from the scapula. There is a 2- to 3-fold increase in the coracoclavicular distance, causing such a severe displacement that the clavicle almost pierces the skin. The humerus and scapula drop without having the clavicular strut to lift them, which manifests as a severely drooping shoulder. This injury generally requires surgery. Distinguishing between Type III and Type V separations on imaging can be unreliable.

=== Type VI ===
This is type III with inferior dislocation of the distal end of the clavicle below the coracoid. This injury is associated with severe trauma and frequently accompanied by multiple other injuries. The mechanism is thought to be severe hyperabduction and external rotation of the arm, combined with retraction of the scapula. The distal clavicle is found in 2 orientations, either subacromial or subcoracoid. With the subcoracoid dislocation, the clavicle becomes lodged behind the intact conjoined tendon. The posterior superior AC ligaments, which often remain attached to the acromion, get displaced into the AC interval, making anatomic reduction difficult. The tissue needs to be surgically cleared and then reattached after reduction. Most patients with type VI injuries have paresthesia that resolves after relocation of the clavicle It is extremely rare and generally only involved with motor vehicle collisions. This requires surgery.

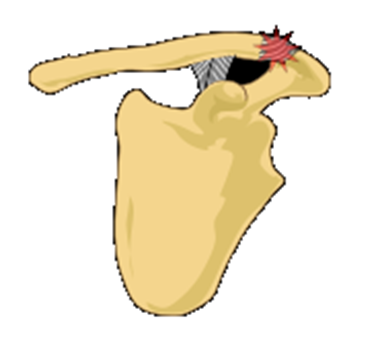
Classification type 1 is the most common type

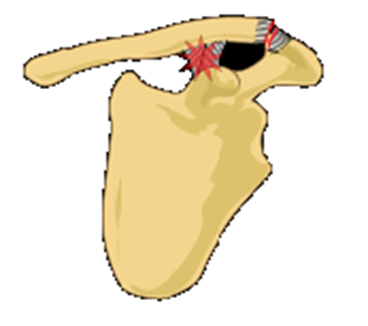
Classification type 2

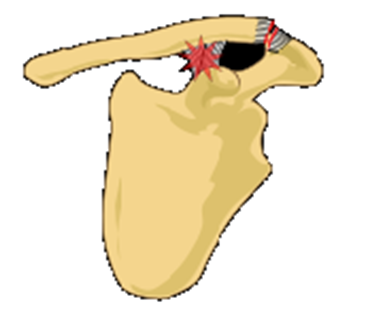
Classification type 3

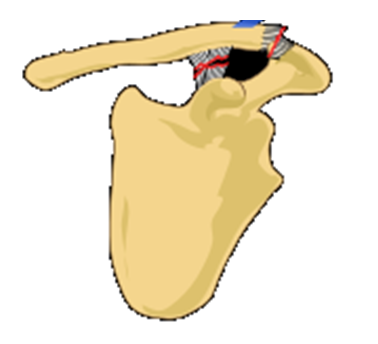
Classification type 4

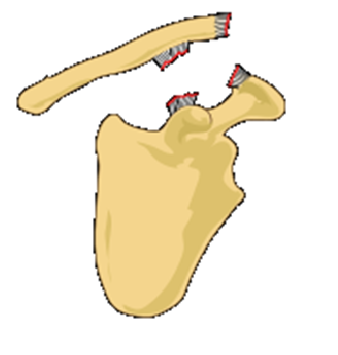
Classification type 5 is rare

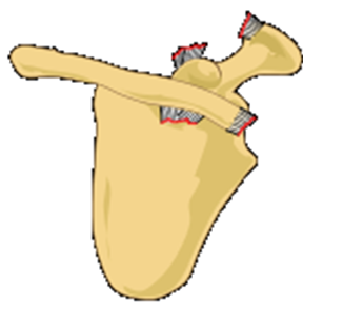
Classification type 6 is rare

== Treatment ==
Treatment of a separated shoulder depends on the severity of the injury. When beginning treatment, the first steps should be to control inflammation, and to rest and ice the joint. Anti-inflammatories such as ibuprofen may also relieve pain and inflammation. The joint should be iced every four hours for fifteen minutes at a time.

=== Non-surgical (conservative treatment approach) ===
Type I and type II shoulder separation are the most common types and rarely need surgery. However, the risk of arthritis with type II separations is greatly increased. If it becomes severe, the Mumford procedure or distal clavicle excision can be performed.

Most non-surgical treatment options include first immobilizing the arm with a sling for approximately 2 weeks followed by gradually improving shoulder movement using physical therapy to build up the muscles and help stabilize the joint.

Literature regarding long-term follow-up after surgical repair of type III injuries is scarce, and those treated nonoperatively generally do quite well. Many studies have come to the conclusion that non-surgical treatment is as good as or better than surgical treatment, or that anything attained because of surgery is quite limited. It appears that after a while, the body "remodels" the joint, either expanding the distal clavicle or causing it to atrophy. There may also be the potential that surgical repair may be less painful in the long run.

Once the pain has eased, range-of-motion exercises can be started followed by a strength training program. The strength training will include strengthening of the rotator cuff, and shoulder blade muscles. With most cases, the pain goes away after three weeks. Although full recovery can take up to six weeks for type II and up to twelve weeks for type III.

Those who do have a separated shoulder will most often return to having full function, although some may have continued pain in the area of the AC joint. With the continued pain there are some things that maybe causing it. It may be due to an abnormal contact between the bone ends when the joint is in motion, the development of arthritis, or an injury to a piece of the cushioning cartilage that is found between the bone ends of this joint.

A meta-analysis done in 2024 that included 13 different studies containing 729 patients showed that the non-surgical approach had a 14%, 28 patients out of 241 patients eventually needed surgical treatment.

=== Surgical ===
Surgical interventions including repositioning of the shoulder joint and repairing torn ligaments may be necessary for severe injuries in which the shoulder is dislocated. Medical device implants including coracoclavicular screws, a hook plate, fixation pins, and surgical wire may be necessary for repair of the joint. Other forms of effective surgical procedures for treating AC joint separation are suture anchors, tendon grafts, hook plates, tight-rope, and EndoButton. Most of these devices need to be surgically removed after the shoulder has healed. Allografts, biological grafts, and arthroscopic-assisted coracoclavicular ligament reconstruction may also be considered.

Type IV, V, and VI shoulder separations are very uncommon but require surgery. There is some debate among orthopedic surgeons, however, about the treatment of type III shoulder separation. Many with type III shoulder separation who do not undergo surgical treatment recover just as well as those who do receive it, and avoid the added risks that surgery may present. Those with type III injuries who opt out of surgery often have faster recovery times, avoid hospitalization, and are able to return to work or sports sooner. Some studies suggest early surgical treatment of type III separation may benefit laborers and athletes who perform overhead motions. The potential benefit of surgical treatment for type III remains unproven.

There have been many surgeries described for complete acromioclavicular separations, including arthroscopic surgery. There is no consensus on which is best. There has been a focus on attempting to restore horizontal, as well as vertical, instability. A review found that although horizontal stability can be more reliably restored with additional acromioclavicular joint reconstruction (in addition to coracoclavicular ligament reconstruction), there is no clear advantage with respect to outcomes.

A common surgery is some form of modified Weaver-Dunn procedure, which involves cutting off the end of the clavicle portion, partially sacrificing the coracoacromial ligament and suturing the displaced acromial end to the lateral aspect of the clavicle for stabilization, then often some form of additional support is introduced to replace the coracoclavicular ligament(s). Variations of this support includes grafting of tendons from the leg or the use of synthetic sutures or suture anchors. Other surgeries have used a Rockwood screw that is inserted initially and then removed after 12 weeks. Physical therapy is always recommended after surgery, and most patients get flexibility back, although possibly somewhat limited.

In a meta-analysis from 2023, the study took from 31 trials, including 1,687 patients, that suture anchors has shown to have the highest functional improvement compared to the other forms of treatments.

After one does have surgery, a sling should be worn to support and protect the shoulder for a few days. For the first couple physical therapy visits, the treatment will focus on controlling the pain and swelling. Type of treatment can include, ice and electrical stimulation, massage, or other hand on treatment to help ease the pain and muscle spasm. After about four weeks range of motion exercises can be started. Passive exercises are done which the shoulder joint is moved but the muscles stay relaxed. After about six to eight weeks active therapy is started. Such exercises can include isometric strengthening which works the muscles without straining the healing of the joint. After about three months, more active strengthening will be incorporated which focus on improving the strength and control of the rotator cuff muscles and the muscles around the shoulder blade. The exercises that the therapist gives the patient to be done at home should be done to be able to get a better recovery in the long run.

=== Physical therapy ===
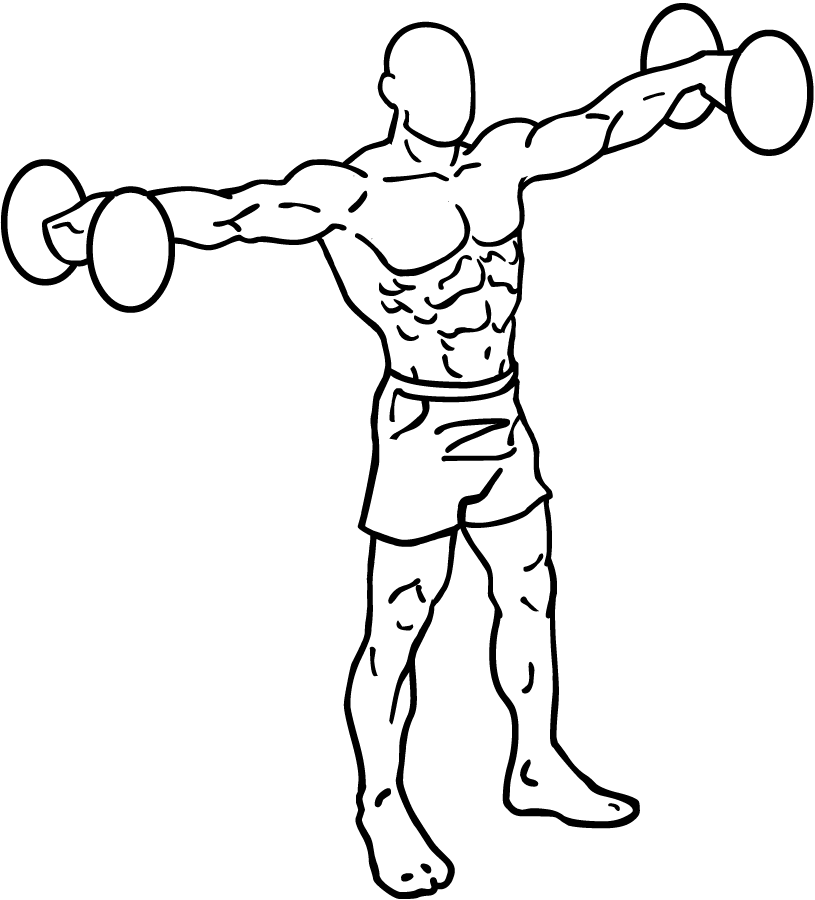
Strengthening the shoulder joint.

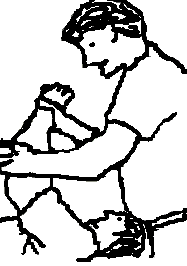
Passively moving the shoulder joint

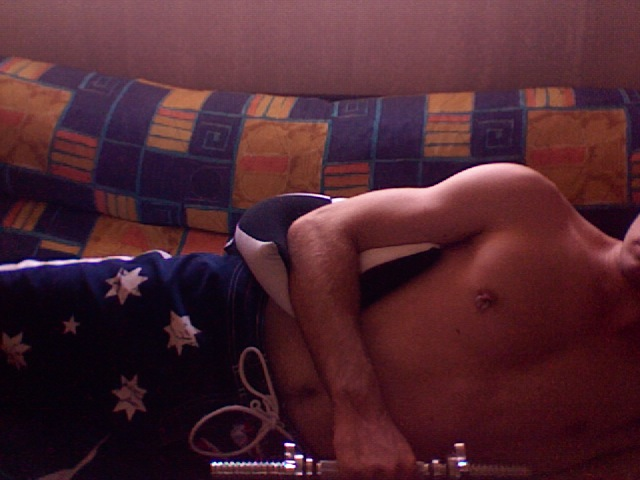
Side-lying external rotation start

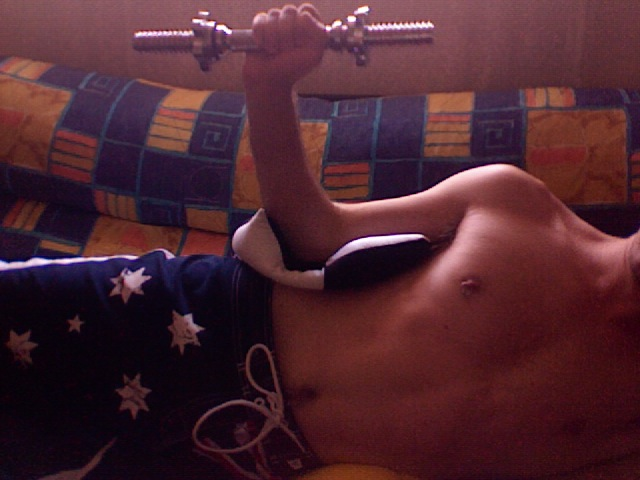
Side-lying external rotation end

Some physical therapy exercises that can be performed to help rehab the shoulder are: While standing and using a theraband you can perform Y, T, and I's, Internal shoulder rotation, External shoulder rotation, Shoulder extensions, and Scapula squeezes While lying on your side you can perform internal rotation and external rotation with a light weight. The light weight can be any type of object such as a 1-5 lb dumbbell weight, or a soup can. Also you can foam roll the pectorals. With the foam roller you can also lie on your back on top of it and do snow angels.

== Epidemiology ==
Acromioclavicular joint dislocation is a common injury to the shoulder and is occurs most often in athletes. This injury has a higher prevalence in men compared to women and approximately 5 men for every 1 women experience this type of injury. Amongst women, the most common sport that lead to this injury type is cycling. Amongst men, accidents or hits in sports such as boxing, football, ice hockey, and martial arts are the most common cause of this injury.

=== Italy ===
In Italy 1.8 out of 10,000 people are estimated to experience an acromioclavicular joint discolation per year, and this type of injury is the most common in injury experienced by adults who participate in sports that include body contact.

=== United States ===
In the United States, an estimated 41% of football players at the collegiate level and 40% of quarterback football players from the National Football League level experience acromioclavicular dislocations.

== See also ==
- Other shoulder problems
