= Weaver–Dunn procedure =

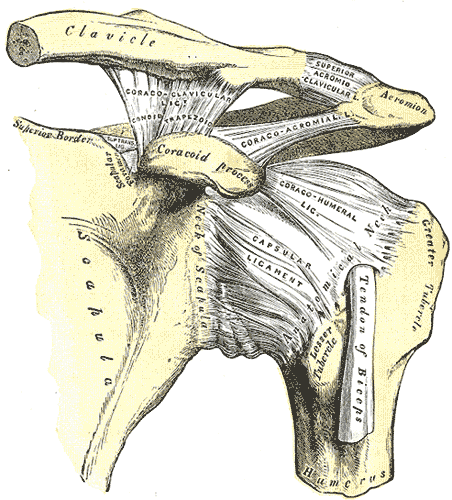
- The left shoulder and acromioclavicular joints, and the proper ligaments of the scapula. (Procedure not illustrated, but positions of the two ligaments are visible. Coraco-acromial visible at upper right.)
- Specialty: Orthopedic surgery
- ICD-9-CM: 81.83

The Weaver–Dunn procedure is a type of surgery involved in the treatment of severe separated shoulders developed by James K. Weaver and Harold K. Dunn in the early 1970s.

The procedure is done to replace the coracoclavicular ligaments with the coracoacromial ligament.

There is currently no "gold standard" surgery to repair acromioclavicular separations, and many surgeries have been created. However, this is one of the more common fixes.

The original surgery is described as follows.

1. Resection of the distal 2 cm of distal clavicle
2. Detaching the acromial end of the coracoacromial ligament, and possibly shortening it.
3. Attaching the remaining ligament to the remaining clavicle with sutures.

Modern variations of the procedure may use additional fixation methods to better stabilize the distal clavicle end as the original construction is rather weak compared to the unharmed shoulder. Even with these modifications, the modern surgeries do not match intact coracoclavicular ligament strength in cadaveric testing. However, such testing does not account for what the living body may perform in the process of healing, in terms of joint remodeling, etc.

== See also ==
- Shoulder surgery
