= Clavicle fracture =

- Other names: Broken collarbone
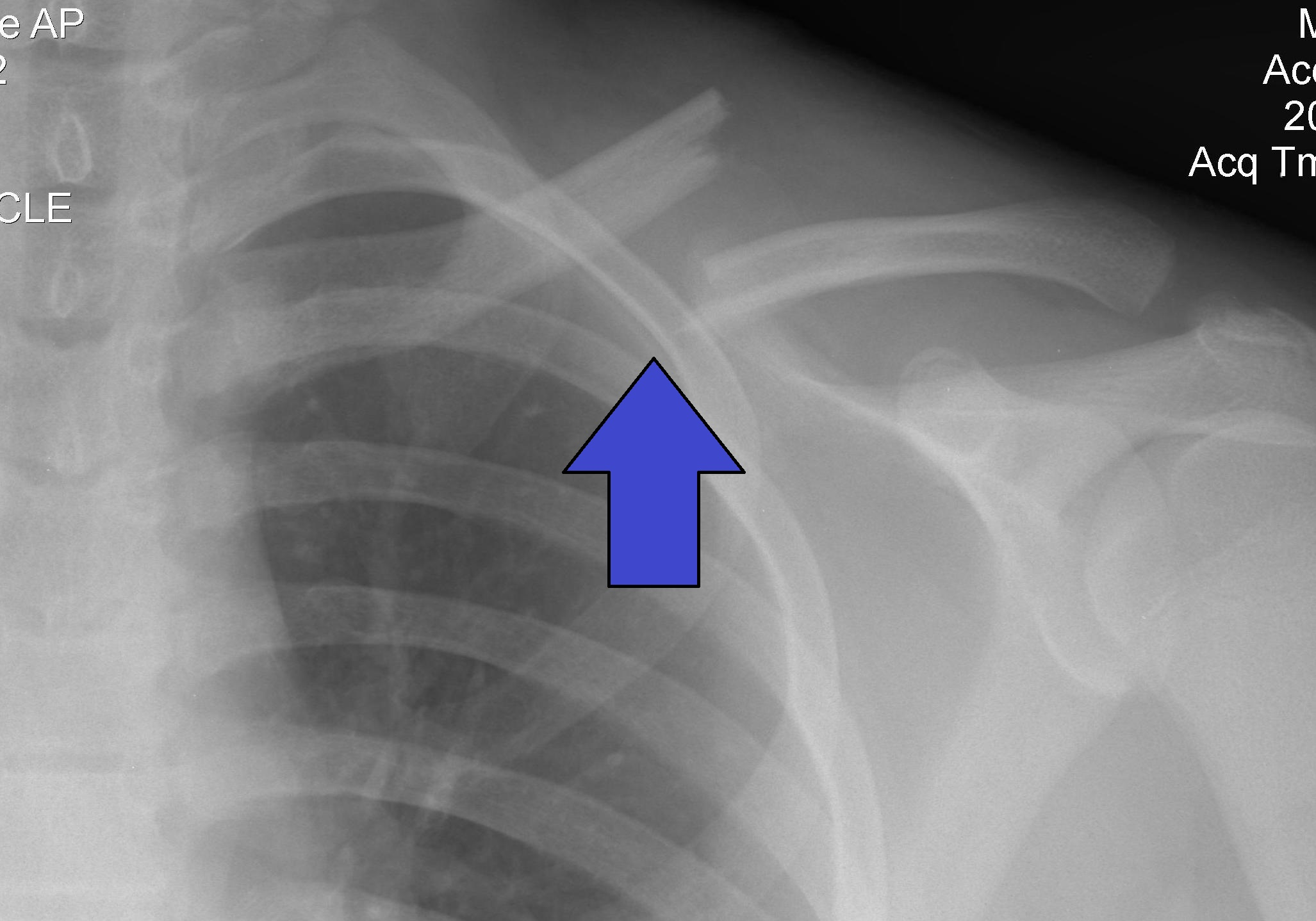
- X-ray of a left clavicle fracture
- Specialty: Emergency medicine
- Symptoms: Pain, deformity of clavicle bone, decreased ability to move the affected arm
- Complications: Unpleasant appearance, non-union (failure of fracture healing), open fracture, Pneumothorax, injury to the nerves or blood vessels in the area,
- Usual onset: Sudden
- Types: Type I (middle third of bone), Type II (lateral third of bone), Type III (medial third of bone)
- Causes: Fall onto a shoulder, outstretched arm, or direct trauma
- Diagnostic method: Based on symptoms, confirmed with X-rays
- Treatment: Pain medication, sling, surgery
- Prognosis: Up to five months for complete healing depending on treatment course (non-operative vs operative) and presence of complications
- Frequency: 5% of adult fractures, 13% of children's fractures

A clavicle fracture, also known as a broken collarbone, is a partial or complete break of the clavicle bone. Symptoms typically include pain and tenderness at the site of the break and a decreased ability to move the affected arm. Other symptoms may also include reports of a cracking sensation during the injury, swelling, and deformity over the injury site. Complications can include a collection of air in the pleural space surrounding the lung (pneumothorax), injury to the nerves or blood vessels in the area, and an unpleasant appearance.

It is most often caused by a fall directly onto a shoulder, direct trauma to the bone, or a fall onto an outstretched arm. The fracture can also occur in a baby during childbirth. Rare causes of clavicle fractures include muscle contractions during seizures and minimal trauma in the setting of pathologic bone conditions. The middle section of the clavicle is most often involved. Diagnosis is typically based on symptoms and trauma then confirmed with X-rays.

Clavicle fractures can be treated operatively or non-operatively. Operative treatment involves alignment and stabilization of the fracture with plates and screws or an intramedullary device. Non-operative treatment consists of immobilization by putting the arm in a standard sling for three to four weeks. Pain medication such as paracetamol (acetaminophen) may be useful. It can take up to five months for the strength of the bone to return to normal. Reasons for surgical repair include an open fracture, involvement of the nerves or blood vessels, tenting of the skin, or severe displacement in a high-demand individual

Clavicle fractures most commonly occur in people under the age of 25 and those over the age of 70. Among the younger group males are more often affected than females. In adults they make up about 5% of all fractures while in children they represent about 13% of fractures.

== Signs and symptoms ==
- Pain, particularly with arm movement or on the front part of upper chest
- Swelling
- Deformity of the clavicle area sometimes with a sharp bone end pressing up from below the skin creating the appearance of a tent held up by poles (skin tenting)
- Often, after the swelling has subsided, the fracture can be felt through the skin
- Sharp pain when any movement is made
- Referred pain: dull to extreme ache in and around clavicle area, including surrounding muscles
- Possible nausea, dizziness, and/or spotty vision due to extreme pain
- Tachypnea (rapid breathing) if the underlying lung is affected (pneumothorax)
- Arm weakness if the underlying neurovascular structures are damaged (brachial plexus injury)

== Mechanism ==
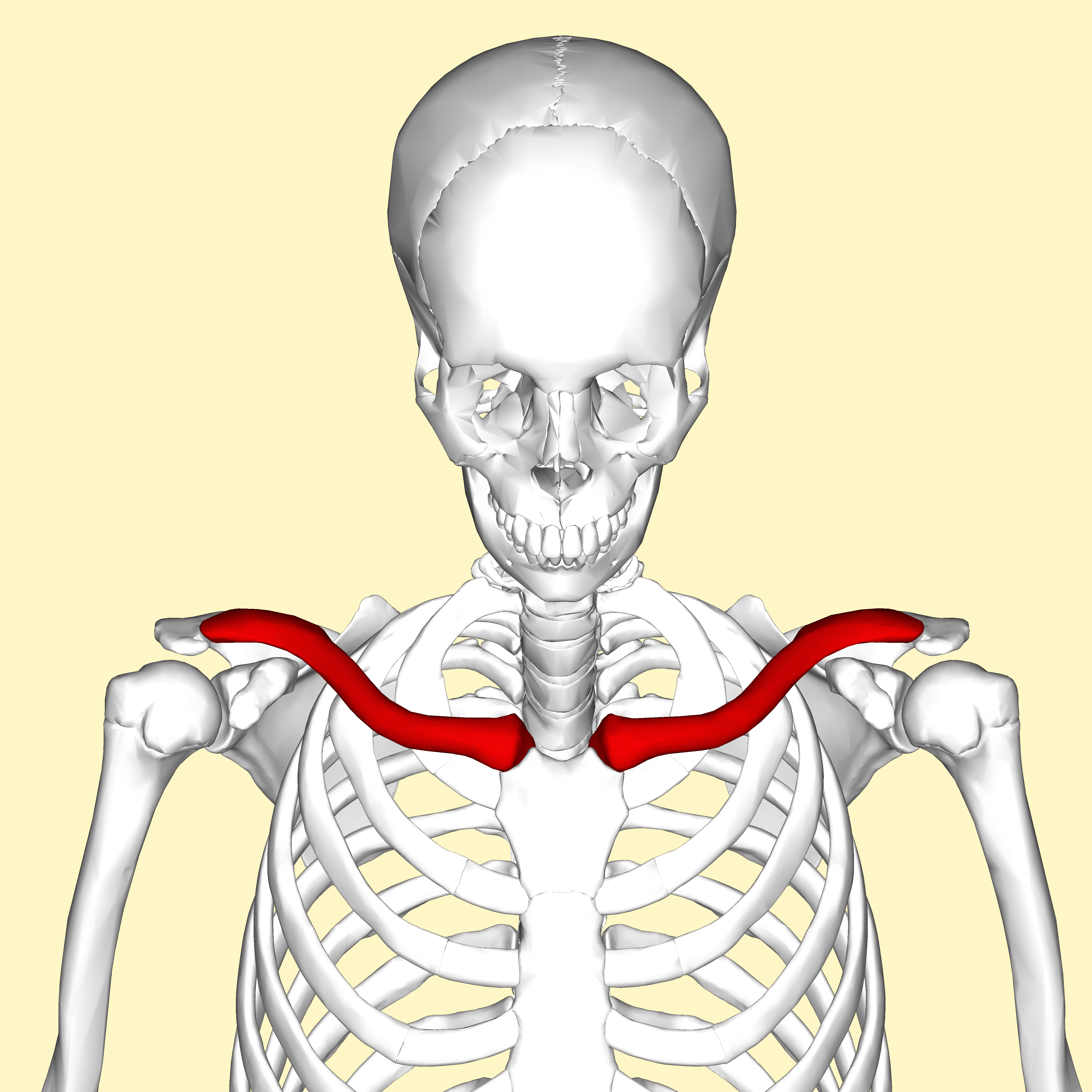
Human skeleton viewed from the front and slightly above with clavicles shaded red

Clavicle fractures are usually a result of injury or trauma. The most common mechanism involves a fall directly onto the shoulder (87%), with less common causes including direct impact to the clavicle (7%), or as a result of a fall onto an outstretched hand (6%). Falling directly on the shoulder or falling on an outstretched arm can transmit forces through the clavicle which acts as a strut between the bones of the arm and the trunk. The muscles involved in clavicle fractures include the deltoid, trapezius, subclavius, sternocleidomastoid, pectoralis minor, and sternohyoid. The ligaments involved include the conoid ligament and trapezoid ligament. Incidents that may lead to a clavicle fracture include automobile accidents, biking accidents (especially common in mountain biking), vertical falls on the shoulder joint, or contact sports such as football, rugby, hurling, or wrestling. Newborns may present clavicle fractures following a difficult delivery involving shoulder dystocia.

Due to the anatomy of the clavicle, 80% of fractures occur in the middle third of its length which is its weakest point. When a clavicle fracture occurs, the sternocleidomastoid tends to pull the proximal (near trunk) portion of the clavicle upwards toward the head while the conoid and trapezoid ligaments, pectoralis minor muscle, and overall weight of the arm pull the distal (near shoulder) portion of the clavicle downwards, away from the head. This creates the typical "S" shaped deformity most often seen with clavicle injuries.

== Anatomy ==
Right clavicle bone with the right side of the skeleton fading in and out

The clavicle serves as a strut and the only bony attachment between the trunk of the body (axial skeleton) and the bones of arm which are otherwise connected to the trunk through a series of muscles and ligaments. A clavicle is located on each side of the front, upper part of the chest and it is located directly above the first rib. The clavicle consists of a medial end, a shaft, and a lateral end. The medial end connects with the manubrium of the sternum and gives attachments to the fibrous capsule of the sternoclavicular joint, articular disc, and interclavicular ligament. The lateral end connects at the acromion of the scapula which is referred to as the acromioclavicular joint. The clavicle forms a slight S-shaped curve where it curves from the sternal end laterally and anteriorly for near half its length, then forming a posterior curve to the acromion of the scapula. The clavicle widens and flattens at both ends while taking a hollow tubular shape through its middle segment with limited medullary bone resulting in a relative weak point where most fractures occur.

== Diagnosis ==
If a clavicle fracture is suspected, the initial method to evaluate for a clavicle fracture is by an AP (anterioposterior; horizontal through the body from front to back) or PA (posterioanterior; horizontal through the body from back to front) X-ray of the affected clavicle to determine the fracture type and extent of injury. When an AP or PA view of the clavicle is taken, the xray beam is horizontal versus the body and the first rib and other structures overlap the clavicle which can make it more difficult to assess the clavicle, to avoid the overlap of other structures an xray of the clavicle can be obtained with a 20-30 degree cephalad (toward the head) to isolate the clavicle. Although the degree of shortening of the clavicle can be often be assessed from the AP or PA dedicated clavicle images, additional AP or PA views of the chest can be taken to compare both clavicles for length or evaluate for other injuries that may be present such as rib fractures. In cases where the physician suspects the fracture may involve the joint surfaces of the clavicle, to differentiate an epiphyseal injury from a sternoclavicular (SC) joint dislocation, or to evaluate injury to underlying neurovascular structures they may order a computerized tomography (CT) scan. Diagnosis through ultrasound imaging performed in the emergency room may be utilized in children.

== Classification ==
A clavicle fracture can be classified and described based on its location, displacement, angulation, pattern, and comminution. The most common classification system for these fractures is the Allman classification system which broadly divides these fractures based upon their location along the clavicle divided into thirds along its length.

=== Allman Classification ===
==== Group I ====
Fractures of the middle third of the clavicle. The most common type of clavicle fracture (80%) which both ends of the clavicle stabilized and secured by muscular and ligamentous attachments.

==== Group II ====
Fractures of the distal third (closest to shoulder) of the clavicle. Second most common type of clavicle fracture (15%). Can be further subdivided based upon fracture relative location to coracoclavicular ligaments as this can inform the presence of involvement of the acromioclavicular joint surface, ligamentous involvement, and fracture stability.

==== Group III ====
Fractures of the proximal third (closest to neck/trunk) of the clavicle. These fractures need to be assessed for epiphyseal (growth plate) injury in pediatric patients. These fractures can be further subdivided based on displacement of the fracture, articular (joint) surface involvement, epiphyseal involvement, and comminution.

== Treatment ==
The treatment of clavicle fractures depends on the type of fracture (Group I, II, or III) based upon which third of the clavicle length is affected, the degree of fracture displacement (distance fragments have moved out of their normal alignment), patient goals (speed of return to activity and activity level), and the presence of complications (open fracture, neurovascular compromise). Based upon these factors, clavicle fractures may be treated nonoperatively with immobilization and activity limitation or operatively. Medication may be prescribed for pain. It is unclear if surgery or conservative management is superior. Antibiotics and tetanus vaccination may be used if the bone breaks through the skin; however, this is uncommon.

=== Nonoperative ===
Current practice for simple fractures without great displacement is generally to provide a sling, and pain relief, and to allow the bone to heal itself, monitoring progress with X-rays every week or few weeks if necessary. Surgery is employed in 5–10% of cases. However, a meta-analysis of 2 144 midshaft clavicle fractures supports primary plate fixation of completely displaced midshaft clavicular fractures in active adult patients.

The arm is usually supported by an external immobilizer to keep the fracture stable and decrease the risk of further damage and pain. The two most common types of fixation are the figure-of-eight splint that wraps the shoulders to keep them forced back and a simple broad arm sling (which supports the weight of the arm). The primary indication is pain relief. Type of sling used does not seem to affect the results as far as healing is concerned but patient satisfaction is lower with the figure-of-eight bandage due to discomfort and skin irritation. No difference in functional outcome has been reported between the two types of immobilization.

There is a lack of consensus on nonoperative vs operative treatment for minimally displaced middle third clavicle fractures with operative treatment possibly leading to lower rates of nonunion and residual deformity but potentially leading to the need for future hardware removal. If the fracture is at the lateral end, the risk of nonunion is greater than if the fracture is of the shaft. However, it seems that this does not affect the functional outcomes in most patients, indicated by recent systematic reviews.

=== Surgical ===
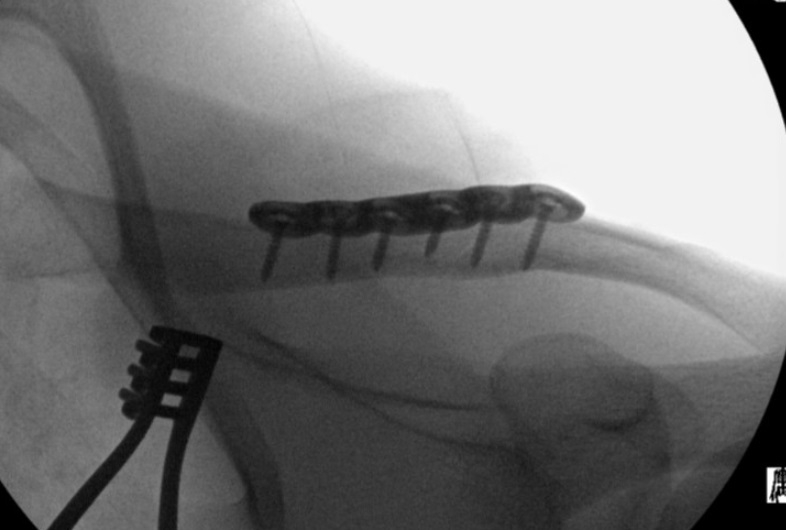
Intra-operative image of clavicle fracture aligned and stabilized by a metal plate held in place by 6 screws. A Weitlaner retractor can also be seen

In children, breaks in the middle of the clavicle treated with surgery resulted in faster recoveries but more complications. The evidence for different types of surgery for breaks of the middle part of the clavicle is poor as of 2023.

Surgery may be considered when one or more of the following is presents

- Comminution with separation (bone is broken into multiple pieces)
- Skin penetration (open fracture)
- Associated nervous and vascular trauma (brachial plexus or supraclavicular nerves)
- Nonunion after several months (3–6 months, typically)
- Displaced distal third fractures (high risk of nonunion)
- Although shortening (as a result of overlap of fracture ends) has often been suggested as an indication for surgery, a review found that people treated without surgery for shortening of mid shaft clavicle fractures did not affect outcomes.

A discontinuity in the bone shape often results from a clavicular fracture, visible through the skin, if not treated with surgery due to imperfect bone alignment or bony callous formation during fracture healing. Surgical procedures often call for open reduction internal [plate] fixation where an anatomically shaped titanium or steel plate is affixed along the superior or anterior aspect of the bone by several screws. In some cases, the plate is removed after healing due to discomfort, to avoid tissue aggravation, osteolysis or subacromial impingement. This is especially important with a special type of fixation plate used in distal third fractures called a hook plate. With anatomical plates, plate removal is considered an elective procedure that is rarely necessary. An alternative to plate fixation is elastic TEN intramedullary nailing. These devices are implanted within the clavicle's canal to support the bone from the inside. Typical surgical complications are infection, loss of sensation below the incision on the chest due to inadvertent injury of one or several supraclavicular nerves (most common when using a horizontal surgical incision), and nonunion of the bone (failure of the bone to properly fuse together). The risk of injury to the supraclavicular nerves can be reduced by using a minimally invasive approach to the clavicle for middle third fractures. Major nerve injury to the brachial plexus or vascular injury is extremely rare.

== Prognosis ==
Healing time varies based on age, health, fracture complexity, location of the break, fracture displacement, treatment course (operative vs nonoperative), and the presence/number of complications.

For adults undergoing nonoperative treatment, one to several weeks of sling immobilization is normally employed to allow for pain relief, initial bone and soft tissue healing; teenagers require slightly less, while children can often achieve the same level in two weeks. During this period, patients may remove the sling to practice passive pendulum range of motion exercises to reduce atrophy in the elbow and shoulder, but they are often minimized to 15–20° off vertical. Depending on the severity of fracture, a person can begin to use the arm if comfortable with movement and no pain results. The final goal is to be able to have full range of motion with no pain; therefore, if any pain occurs, allowing for more recovery time is best. Depending on severity of the fracture, athletes involved in contact sports may need a longer period of rest to heal to avoid re-fracturing the clavicle due to the higher demand placed on this bone. Full bone strength can take several months to years after fracture, with most studies showing substantial recovery by 3–6 months but complete restoration of strength often requiring 1–2 years or longer.

For patients undergoing operative treatment, functional recovery and return to work often occurs early than those undergoing nonoperative treatment for the similar fractures although long-term results show no significant difference. Complication rates are relatively low but include infection (0.6-3.2% deep infections), hardware irritation requiring removal (approximately 10%), and wound-related issues.

== Epidemiology ==
Clavicle fractures occur at 30–64 cases per 100,000 a year and are responsible for 2.6–5.0% of all fractures and 44-66% of fractures around the shoulder. Fractures of the middle third of the clavicle are the most common and make up 80% of all clavicle fractures. Lateral third (closest to shoulder) and medial third (closest to trunk) fractures consist of 15% and 5% of clavicle fractures respectively. This type of fracture occurs more often in males. Clavicle fractures involve roughly 5% of all fractures seen in hospital emergency admissions. Clavicles are the most commonly broken bone in the human body.

== History ==
Hippocrates, 4th century BC:

When, then, a [clavicle] fracture has recently taken place, the patients attach much importance to it, as supposing the mischief greater than it really is, and the physicians bestow great pains in order that it may be properly bandaged; but in a little time the patients, having no pain, nor finding any impediment to their walking or eating, become negligent; and the physicians finding they cannot make the parts look well, take themselves off, and are not sorry at the neglect of the patient, and in the meantime the callus is quickly formed.

From an ancient Egyptian text of approximately the 30th century B.C., in a copy known as the Edwin Smith papyrus, J. Breasted translation, case 35:

If thou examinest a man having a break in his collar bone and shouldst thou find his collar bone short and separated from its fellow, thou shouldst say concerning him: "One having a break in his collar-bone. An ailment which I will treat." Place him prostrate on his back with something folded between his shoulder blades; thou shouldst spread out with his two shoulders to stretch apart his collar bone until the break falls in its place.

All the cases in this text describe examination, prognosis, and (where applicable) treatment, in that order.
