= Coracoid tuberosity =

Coracoid tuberosity may refer to:

- coracoid process of the scapula
- conoid tubercle of the clavicle
