= Costoclavicular ligament =

Ligament of the shoulder girdle

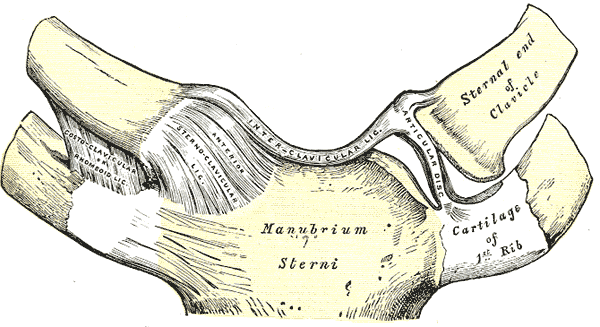
- Sternoclavicular articulation. Anterior view. (Costoclavicular labeled at far left.)

Details
- From: First rib ("costa prima")
- To: Clavicle (costal tuberosity)

Identifiers
- Latin: ligamentum costoclaviculare
- TA98: A03.5.04.005
- TA2: 1756
- FMA: 26014

The costoclavicular ligament, also known as the rhomboid ligament or Halsted's ligament, is a ligament of the shoulder girdle. It is short, flat, and rhomboid in form. It is the major stabilizing factor of the sternoclavicular joint and is the axis of movement of the joint, especially during elevation of the clavicle.

Attached below to the upper and medial part of the cartilage of the first rib, it ascends at an angle posteriorly and laterally, and is fixed above to the costal tuberosity on the inferior aspect of the clavicle.

It is in relation, in front, with the tendon of origin of the subclavius; behind, with the subclavian vein.
