= Sternoclavicular ligament =

Sternoclavicular ligament can refer to:

- Anterior sternoclavicular ligament (ligamentum sternoclaviculare anterius)
- Posterior sternoclavicular ligament (ligamentum sternoclaviculare posterius)
