= Eugene Bishop Mumford =

American surgeon (1879–1961)

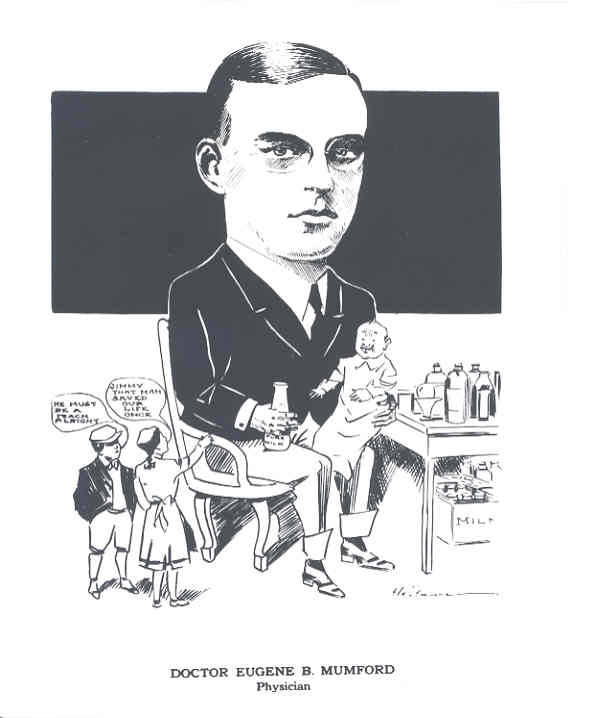
Dr. E.B. Mumford Caricature 1920s

Dr. Eugene Bishop or E.B. Mumford (1879–1961) was an American orthopedic surgeon, founder, and president of the American Academy of Orthopedic Surgeons. Mumford was known for his pioneering research of arthritis, joint stiffness, and creation of distal clavical excision or acromioplasty commonly known as The Mumford Procedure.

== Life ==
Mumford was born in 1879 in New Harmony, Indiana to a family of prominent Owenites. Mumford graduated from the University of Wisconsin in 1901 and Johns Hopkins in 1905. He obtained postgraduate training at Boston Children's Hospital and Gouverneur's Hospital in New York. He returned to Indiana in 1915 to establish a children's orthopedics practice and married Elsa Frenzel in 1917. His practice was interrupted by WWI, where he served as a captain at the "Eli Lilly" Base Hospital No. 32 in Contrexeville, France. He returned to Indianapolis after the war and opened the Indianapolis Industrial Clinic with Dr. Jay Reed in 1920. He later was appointed to the faculty at the Medical College of Indiana and was one of the first surgeons at the James Whitcomb Riley Hospital for Crippled Children. He continued these appointments until his 1961 death in Indianapolis.

== Legacy in orthopedics ==
Dr. Mumford specialized in industrial injuries and was a leading contributor to the literature on mobilization of joint injury publishing hundreds of articles in his lifetime. In 1931 Mumford was one of the eight founders of the American Academy of Orthopedic Surgeons and served as its president for two terms. In 1941 Mumford patented a procedure for distal clavical resection or acromioplasty commonly known as The Mumford Procedure, named in the surgeon's honor. The surgery aims to relieve shoulder pain by removing a small part of the clavicle, or collar bone. Patients with inflammation, swelling, or osteoarthritis in the acromioclavicular (AC) joint elect to have this procedure, if alternative solutions like physical therapy and cortisone injections are unsuccessful. The surgery can be performed using an open or arthroscopic procedure, and typically requires ten weeks recovery time.

== See also ==
- The Mumford Procedure
- American Academy of Orthopedic Surgeons
- Orthopedic Surgeons
- New Harmony, Indiana
- Indianapolis, Indiana
