= Mumford procedure =

Surgery to remove part of the collarbone

- Other names: Distal clavicle excision
- Specialty: Orthopedic

The Mumford procedure, also known as distal clavicle excision or distal clavicle resection, is an orthopedic procedure performed to ameliorate shoulder pain and discomfort by excising the distal (lateral) end of the clavicle. Those suffering from osteoarthritis in the acromioclavicular joint can opt for this procedure when non-surgical alternatives (e.g., cortisone injection) are unsuccessful. The surgery can be performed through an open or arthroscopic procedure. A regimen of physical therapy following surgery is prescribed and most patients experience full recovery within 8 to 10 weeks post-surgery. The procedure was created by, and named for, orthopedic surgeon Eugene Bishop Mumford in 1941.
