= Costal tuberosity of clavicle =

Costal tuberosity

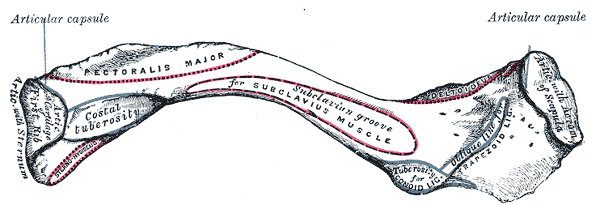
- Left clavicle. Inferior surface. (Costal tuberosity labeled at center left.)

Details

Identifiers
- Latin: impressio ligamenti costoclavicularis, tuberositas costalis claviculae
- TA98: A02.4.02.004
- TA2: 1171
- FMA: 75810

On the medial part of the clavicle is a broad rough surface, the costal tuberosity (impression for costoclavicular ligament), rather more than 2 cm. in length, for the attachment of the costoclavicular ligament.
