= Anterior sternoclavicular ligament =

Ligament between the sternum and clavicle

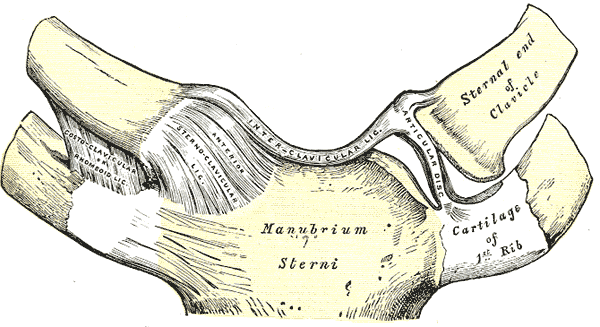
- Sternoclavicular articulation seen from front (anterior sternoclavicular ligament labeled at upper left)

Details
- From: Sternum (manubrium)
- To: Clavicle

Identifiers
- Latin: ligamentum sternoclaviculare anterius
- TA98: A03.5.04.003
- TA2: 1754
- FMA: 26011

The anterior sternoclavicular ligament is a broad band of fibers attached to the clavicle above, and to the manubrium below. The ligament overlies the anterior (front) surface of sternoclavicular joint.

== Anatomy ==
=== Attachments ===
It is attached superiorly to the anterosuperior aspect of the sternal end of the clavicle, and inferiorly to the anterosuperior aspect of the manubrium of the sternum as well as the first costal cartilage. The ligament passes obliquely inferomedially from its superior attachment to its inferior attachment.

=== Relations ===
This ligament is covered by the sternal portion of the sternocleidomastoideus and the integument. The joint capsule, disc, and two synovial membranes are situated posterior to the ligament.
