= Trapezoid line =

Oblique line for trapezoid ligament

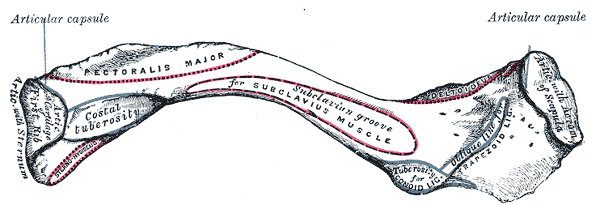
- Left clavicle. Inferior surface. (Oblique line for trapezoid lig. labeled at center right.)

Details

Identifiers
- Latin: linea trapezoidea
- TA98: A02.4.02.011
- TA2: 1178
- FMA: 74586

From the conoid tubercle, an oblique ridge, the trapezoid line, trapezoid ridge, or oblique, runs forward and lateralward, and affords attachment to the trapezoid ligament on inferior surface of clavicle.
