= Coracoid =

Paired bone, part of the shoulder in some vertebrates

Diagram of skeletal structure and musculature of a bird's wing

A coracoid (Note: From Greek κόραξ, koraks, raven and eidos, resembling, like [also gives rise to sarcoid]. Overall the word means "like the beak of a raven or crow". To ancient anatomists it looked like that.) is a paired bone which is part of the shoulder assembly in all vertebrates except therian mammals (marsupials and placentals). In therian mammals (including humans), a coracoid process is present as part of the scapula, but this is not homologous with the coracoid bone of most other vertebrates.

In other tetrapods, it joins the scapula to the front end of the sternum and has a notch on the dorsal surface which, along with a similar notch on the ventral surface of the scapula, forms the socket in which the proximal end of the humerus (upper arm bone) is located. The acrocoracoid process is an expansion adjacent to this contact surface, to which the shoulderward end of the biceps brachii muscle attaches in these animals. In birds (and generally theropods and related animals), the entire unit is rigid and called scapulocoracoid. This plays a major role in bird flight. In other dinosaurs, the main bones of the pectoral girdle were the scapula (shoulder blade) and the coracoid, both of which directly articulated with the clavicle.

In fish, it provides the base for the pectoral fin.

Monotremes, as well as the extinct therapsids, possess both the coracoid bone of reptiles (a.k.a. the procoracoid, or anterior coracoid), and the coracoid process of other mammals, with the latter being present as a separate bone.

== See also ==
- Coracoid process
