= Coracoacromial ligament =

Ligament between the coracoid process and the acromion of the scapula

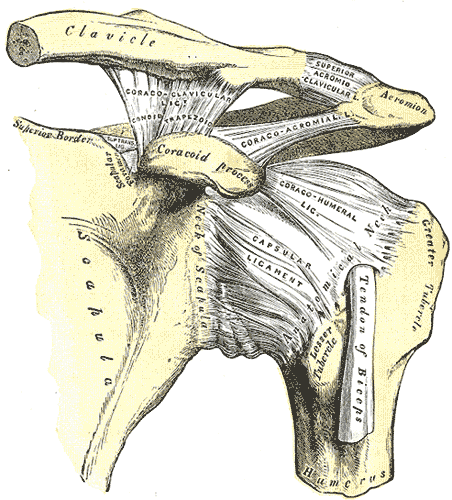
- The left shoulder and acromioclavicular joints, and the proper ligaments of the scapula. (Coraco-acromial visible at upper right.)

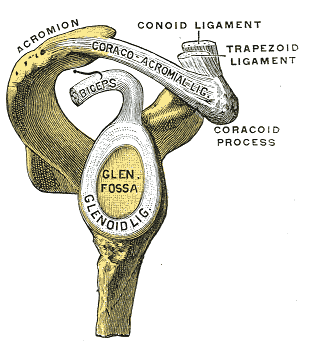
- Glenoid fossa of right side.

Details
- From: Coracoid process
- To: Acromion

Identifiers
- Latin: ligamentum coracoacromiale
- TA98: A03.5.01.002
- TA2: 1740
- FMA: 25943

The coracoacromial ligament is a strong triangular ligament between the coracoid process and the acromion. It protects the head of the humerus. Its acromial attachment may be repositioned to the clavicle during reconstructive surgery of the acromioclavicular joint (shoulder joint).

== Structure ==
The coracoacromial ligament originates from the summit of the acromion of the scapula, just in front of the articular surface for the clavicle. It inserts by its broad base along the whole length of the lateral border of the coracoid process of the scapula.

The clavicle and under surface of the deltoid muscle are above it. The tendon of the supraspinatus muscle (and its bursa) are below it.

Its lateral border is continuous with a dense lamina that passes beneath the deltoid muscle upon the tendons of the supraspinatus and infraspinatus muscle.

The ligament is sometimes described as consisting of two marginal bands and a thinner intervening portion, the two bands being attached respectively to the apex and the base of the coracoid process, and joining at the acromion.

When the pectoralis minor is inserted, as occasionally is the case, into the capsule of the shoulder-joint instead of into the coracoid process, it passes between these two bands, and the intervening portion of the ligament is then deficient.

== Function ==
Together with the coracoid process and the acromion, the coracoacromial ligament forms a vault or arch that protects the head of the humerus.

== Clinical significance ==
The coracoacromial ligament may impinge and compress rotator cuff muscle or tendon. It may be damaged during a shoulder injury.

The attachment of the coracoacromial ligament may be moved from acromion to the end of the clavicle when reconstructing the acromioclavicular joint. This often fails. It has lower strength than the coracoclavicular ligament.
