= Interclavicular ligament =

Flattened band, which varies considerably in form and size in different individuals

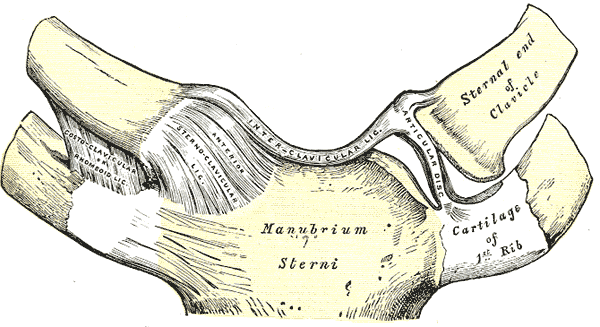
- Sternoclavicular articulation. Anterior view. (Interclavicular ligament visible at center top.)

Details
- From: Clavicle
- To: Clavicle

Identifiers
- Latin: ligamentum interclaviculare
- TA98: A03.5.04.006
- TA2: 1757
- FMA: 26013

The interclavicular ligament is a flattened band, which varies considerably in form and size in different individuals, it passes in a curved direction from the upper part of the sternal end of one clavicle to that of the other, and is also attached to the upper margin of the sternum.

It is in relation, in front, with the integument and Sternocleidomastoidei; behind, with the Sternothyreoidei.
