= Acromioclavicular joint =

Shoulder junction between the scapula and the clavicle

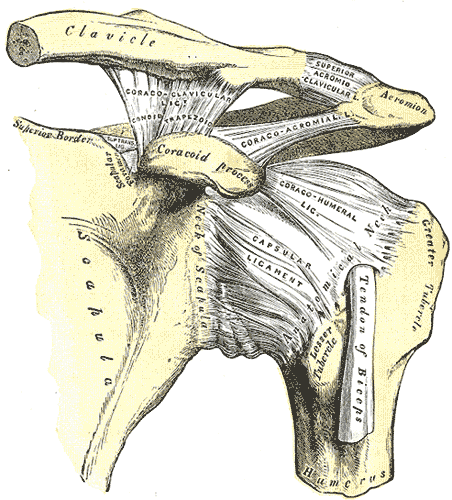
- The left shoulder and acromioclavicular joint

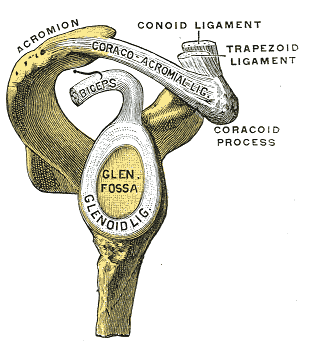
- Glenoid cavity of the right scapula

Details

Identifiers
- Latin: articulatio acromioclavicularis
- MeSH: D000173
- TA98: A03.5.03.001
- TA2: 1744
- FMA: 25898

The acromioclavicular joint, or AC joint, is a joint at the top of the shoulder. It is the junction between the acromion (part of the scapula that forms the highest point of the shoulder) and the clavicle. It is a plane synovial joint.

== Structure ==
=== Ligaments ===
The joint is stabilized by three ligaments:

- The acromioclavicular ligament, which attaches the clavicle to the acromion of the scapula.

Superior acromioclavicular ligament

This ligament is a quadrilateral band, covering the superior part of the articulation, and extending between the upper part of the lateral end of the clavicle and the adjoining part of the upper surface of the acromion.

It is composed of parallel fibers, which interlace with the aponeuroses of the trapezius and deltoideus; below, it is in contact with the articular disk when this is present.

Inferior acromioclavicular ligament

This ligament is somewhat thinner than the preceding; it covers the under part of the articulation, and is attached to the adjoining surfaces of the two bones.

It is in relation, above, in rare cases with the articular disk; below, with the tendon of the supraspinatus

- The coracoacromial ligament, which runs from the coracoid process to the acromion.

The coracoacromial ligament is a strong triangular band, extending between the coracoid process and the acromion.

It is attached, by its apex, to the summit of the acromion just in front of the articular surface for the clavicle; and by its broad base to the whole length of the lateral border of the coracoid process.

This ligament, together with the coracoid process and the acromion, forms a vault for the protection of the head of the humerus.

It is in relation, above, with the clavicle and under surface of the deltoid; below, with the tendon of the supraspinatus, a bursa being interposed.

Its lateral border is continuous with a dense lamina that passes beneath the deltoid upon the tendons of the supraspinatus and infraspinatus.

The ligament is sometimes described as consisting of two marginal bands and a thinner intervening portion, the two bands being attached respectively to the apex and the base of the coracoid process, and joining at the acromion.

When the pectoralis minor is inserted, as occasionally is the case, into the capsule of the shoulder-joint instead of into the coracoid process, it passes between these two bands, and the intervening portion of the ligament is then deficient.

- The coracoclavicular ligament, which consists of two ligaments, the conoid and the trapezoid ligaments.

The coracoclavicular ligament serves to connect the clavicle with the coracoid process of the scapula.

It does not properly belong to the acromioclavicular joint articulation, but is usually described with it, since it forms a most efficient means of retaining the clavicle in contact with the acromion. It consists of two fasciculi, called the trapezoid ligament and conoid ligament.

These ligaments are in relation, in front, with the subclavius and deltoid; behind, with the trapezius.

=== Variation ===
An X-ray study of 100 shoulders in US soldiers found considerable variation in the size and shape of the joint. The articular surfaces were notably different in size and form. On some, they are separated by a meniscus attached to the superior acromioclavicular ligament. This meniscus may be a blade of fibrocartilage that extends nearly halfway into the joint or it may form a complete disc that divides the joint into two parts. In other joints, no synovial joint is present with the joint being made by a pad of fibrous tissue attached to the outer end of the clavicle, and no articular cavity.

== Function ==
The acromioclavicular joint provides the ability to raise the arm above the head. This joint functions as a pivot point (although technically it is a gliding synovial joint), acting like a strut to help with movement of the scapula resulting in a greater degree of arm rotation.

== Clinical significance ==
=== Injury ===
A common injury to the AC joint is dislocation, often called AC separation or shoulder separation. This is not the same as a "shoulder dislocation," which refers to dislocation of the glenohumeral joint.

Acromioclavicular joint dislocation is particularly common in collision sports such as ice hockey, football, Judo, rugby and Aussie rules, and is also a problem for those who participate in swimming, horseback riding, mountain biking, biking, snow skiing and skateboarding. The most common mechanism of injury is a fall on the tip of the shoulder or FOOSH (Fall On OutStretched Hand).

Acromioclavicular joint dislocations are graded from I to VI. Grading is based upon the degree of separation of the acromion from the clavicle with weight applied to the arm.

- Grade I is slight displacement of the joint, and a badly stretched or partially torn AC ligament. It has the normal separation of <4 mm.
- Grade II is a partial dislocation of the AC joint with a complete disruption tear of the AC joint and a partial disruption of coracoclavicular ligament. The AC gap is >5 mm. Grades I and II never require surgery and heal by themselves, though physical therapy may be required.
- Grade III is complete disruption of AC and CC ligaments. On plain film the inferior aspect of the clavicle will be above the superior aspect of the acromion. This can also be assessed with an MRI scan, which will also demonstrate disruption of the coracoclavicular ligaments (the degree depending on the severity of AC joint disruption) as well as tearing of the joint capsule. The joint will be very tender and swollen on examination. Grade III separations most often do not require surgery and shoulder function should return to normal after 16–20 weeks. However, there will be some physical deformity of the shoulder with a noticeable bump resulting from the dislocation of the clavicle.
- Grades IV-VI are complications on a 'standard' dislocation involving a displacement of the clavicle, and will almost always require surgery. Dynamic US is critical to detect mild (grade I) dislocations, especially because they may present as a normal joint in static images. Doppler US may also be used to increase diagnostic confidence to detect low-grade injuries because it depicts reparative process to injured ligament.

=== Osteoarthritis ===
Osteoarthritis of the acromioclavicular joint is not uncommon. It may be caused by a prior trauma (secondary osteoarthritis) or occur as a chronic degenerative disorder often co-existing with subacromial impingement.

== Additional images ==
Diagram of the human shoulder joint, front view

Diagram of the human shoulder joint, back view

== See also ==
- Shoulder girdle (Pectoral girdle)
- Glenohumeral joint (Shoulder joint)
- Shoulder
- Sternoclavicular joint
