= Conoid ligament =

Ligament of the shoulder girdle

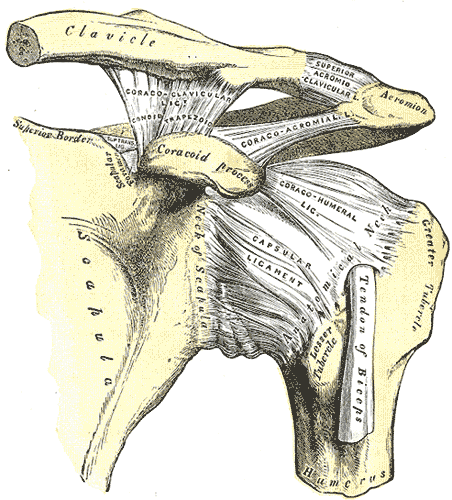
- The left shoulder and acromioclavicular joints, and the proper ligaments of the scapula. (Conoid visible at upper left.)

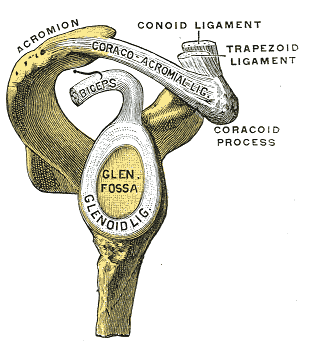
- Glenoid fossa of right side.

Details
- From: Coracoid process (scapula)
- To: Conoid tubercle (clavicle)

Identifiers
- Latin: ligamentum conoideum
- TA98: A03.5.03.006
- TA2: 1749
- FMA: 26031

The conoid ligament is the posterior and medial fasciculus of the coracoclavicular ligament. It is formed by a dense band of fibers, conical in form, with its base directed upward.

It is attached by its apex to a rough impression at the base of the coracoid process on the scapula, medial to the trapezoid ligament; above, by its expanded base, to the conoid tubercle on the under surface of the clavicle, and to a line proceeding medialward from it for 1.25 cm.

These ligaments are in relation, in front, with the subclavius and deltoid muscles; behind, with the trapezius.
