= Sternoclavicular joint =

Joint between the manubrium of the sternum and the clavicle bone

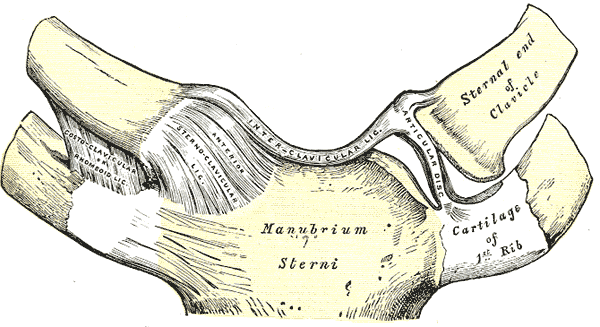
- Sternoclavicular joint. Anterior view.

- Sternoclavicular joint visible near center but not labeled.

Details

Identifiers
- Latin: articulatio sternoclavicularis
- MeSH: D013247
- TA98: A03.5.04.001
- TA2: 1750
- FMA: 25883

The sternoclavicular joint or sternoclavicular articulation is a synovial saddle joint between the manubrium of the sternum, and the clavicle, and the first costal cartilage. The joint possesses a joint capsule, and an articular disc, and is reinforced by multiple ligaments.

== Structure ==
The joint is structurally classified as a synovial saddle joint and functionally classed as a diarthrosis and multiaxial joint. It is composed of two portions separated by an articular disc of fibrocartilage.

The joint is formed by the sternal end of the clavicle, the clavicular notch of the sternum, and (the superior surface of) the costal cartilage of the first rib. The articular surface of the clavicle is larger than that of the sternum, and is invested with a layer of cartilage, which is considerably thicker than that of the sternum.

The joint receives arterial supply via branches of the internal thoracic artery and the suprascapular artery. It is innervated via the medial supraclavicular nerve (superficially), and the nerve to subclavius (deeply).

=== Joint capsule ===
The joint capsule is thickened anteriorly and posteriorly, but is thinner superiorly and (especially) inferiorly, where it consists mostly of loose areolar connective tissue.

=== Articular disc ===
The joint features a fibrocartilaginous articular disc, which completely divides the joint to form two articular compartments. The disc acts to increase the range of movement of the joint.

=== Ligaments ===
The joint is reinforced by two intrinsic and two extrinsic ligaments. The costoclavicular ligament is the main limitation to movement, and therefore the main stabilizer of the joint.

- Anterior sternoclavicular ligament (intrinsic)
- Posterior sternoclavicular ligament (intrinsic)
- Costoclavicular ligament (extrinsic)
- Interclavicular ligament (extrinsic)

== Function ==
The sternoclavicular joint allows movement of the clavicle in three planes, predominantly in the anteroposterior and vertical planes, although some rotation also occurs. A description of movement would be elevation and depression. Muscles do not directly act on this joint, although almost all actions of the shoulder girdle or the scapula will cause some motion at this articulation.

The unique double-hinged articular disk found at the junction of the clavicular head and manubrium allows for movement between the clavicle and the disk during elevation and depression of the scapula. This disk also allows motion between the sternum (manubrium) and itself during protraction and retraction of the scapula.

== Clinical significance ==
=== Dislocation ===
Sternoclavicular dislocation is rare, but may result from direct trauma to the clavicle or indirect forces applied to the shoulder. Posterior dislocations deserve special attention, as they have the potential to be life-threatening because of the risk of damage to vital structures in the mediastinum; surgery can be used to fix such dislocations, as they are unlikely to heal by themselves. A spontaneous partial dislocation may also sometimes occur.

=== Other ===
In SAPHO syndrome there may be arthropathy of the sternoclavicular joint.

Septic arthritis may rarely affect the sternoclavicular joint.

== See also ==
- Acromioclavicular joint
- Shoulder
- Shoulder girdle (Pectoral girdle)
- Shoulder joint
