= Trapezoid ligament =

Ligament from the clavicle (collarbone) to the scapula (shoulder blade)

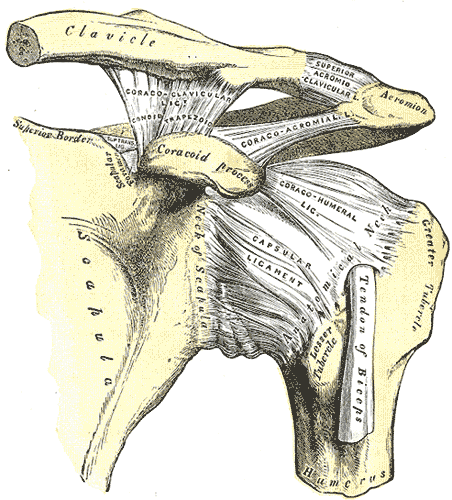
- The left shoulder and acromioclavicular joints, and the proper ligaments of the scapula. (Trapezoid visible at center top.)

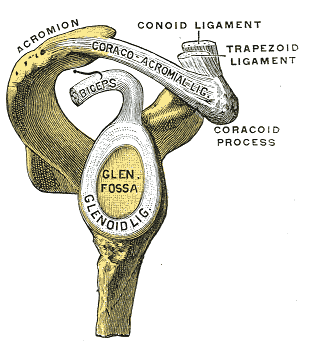
- Glenoid fossa of right side.

Details
- From: Coracoid process (scapula)
- To: Trapezoid line (clavicle)

Identifiers
- Latin: ligamentum trapezoideum
- TA98: A03.5.03.005
- TA2: 1748
- FMA: 26030

The trapezoid ligament is a ligament connecting the coracoid process of the scapula (the shoulder blade) to the trapezoid line of the clavicle (collarbone). It is an anterior and lateral fasciculus, and is broad, thin, and quadrilateral. Its anterior border is free; its posterior border is joined with the conoid ligament, the two forming, by their junction, an angle projecting backward.
