= Coracoclavicular ligament =

Ligament of the shoulder

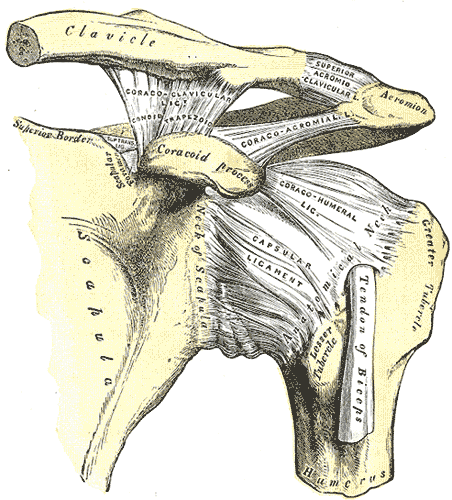
- The left shoulder and acromioclavicular joints, and the proper ligaments of the scapula.

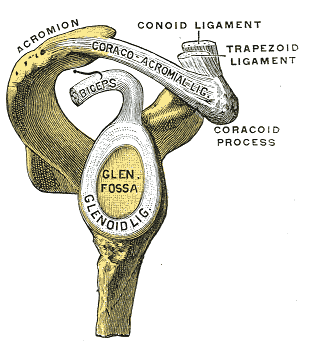
- Glenoid fossa of right side.

Details
- From: Coracoid process
- To: Clavicle

Identifiers
- Latin: ligamentum coracoclaviculare
- TA98: A03.5.03.004
- TA2: 1747
- FMA: 26029

The coracoclavicular ligament is a ligament of the shoulder. It connects the clavicle to the coracoid process of the scapula.

== Structure ==
The coracoclavicular ligament connects the clavicle to the coracoid process of the scapula. It is not part of the acromioclavicular joint articulation, but is usually described with it, since it keeps the clavicle in contact with the acromion. It consists of two fasciculi, the trapezoid ligament in front, and the conoid ligament behind. These ligaments are in relation, in front, with the subclavius muscle and the deltoid muscle; behind, with the trapezius.

=== Variation ===
The insertions of the coracoclavicular ligament can occur in slightly different places in different people. It may contain three fascicles rather than two.

== Function ==
The coracoclavicular ligament is a strong stabilizer of the acromioclavicular joint. It is also important in the transmission of weight of the upper limb to the axial skeleton. There is very little movement at the AC joint.

== Clinical significance ==
The coracoclavicular ligament may be damaged during a severe dislocated clavicle. Damage may be repaired with surgery.
