= Neer impingement test =

Medical test

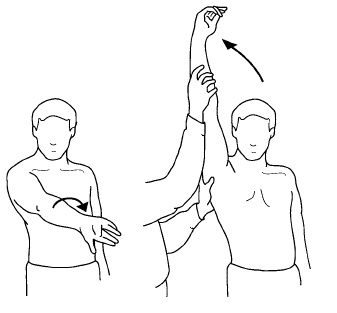
Neer test for subacromial impingement

The Neer impingement test is a test designed to reproduce symptoms of rotator cuff impingement through flexing the shoulder and pressure application. Symptoms should be reproduced if there is a problem with the supraspinatus or biceps brachii. This test is also associated with the Hawkins-Kennedy Test and Jobe's Test.

== Procedure ==
The patient is asked to sit on the examination table or to stand next to it with arms in internal rotation. Examiner should stand on the side which is being tested. Examiner will place one hand on the patient's scapula, and the other hand on the patient's arm below the elbow. The examiner will passively flex the shoulder forward.

== Mechanism ==
When performing the Neer impingement test, the elbow should be extended, humerus in internal rotation and the forearm pronated. When the examiner is passively flexing the arm forward, it is causing compression of the structures between the greater tuberosity, inferior acromion process and the acromioclavicular joint.

== Results ==
A positive test is indicated by pain in the anterior or lateral shoulder when in full flexion. It is indicative of problems involving the supraspinatus and the long head of the biceps brachii tendons. The examiner needs to be aware of a false positive test which is due to the patient having limited forward flexion.

== History ==
The Neer impingement test was created by orthopedic surgeon Charles S. Neer, II, MD, in 1972, based on what he observed as he performed shoulder operations. He noted that there was a significant degeneration in the supraspinatus tendon. He found that when the arm was in flexion and internal rotation it compressed on the tendons under the acromioclavicular joint. Therefore, he created this test to reproduce the symptoms looking for an impingement in that area.
