= Calcific bursitis =

Medical condition – Calcium deposits within the bursae

Calcific Bursitis
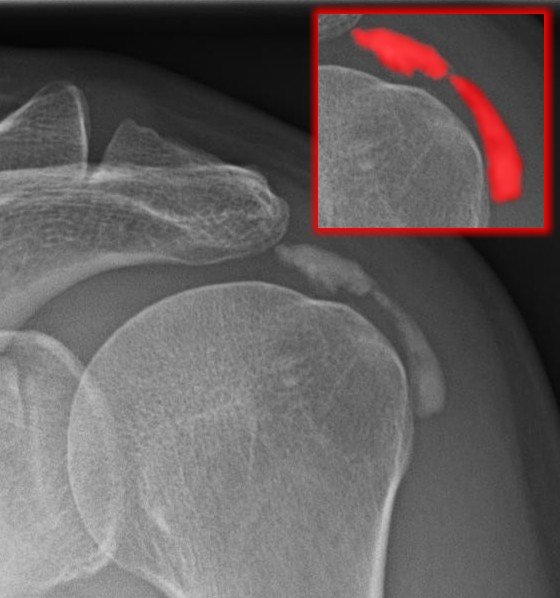
- Specialty: Rheumatology
- Symptoms: Pain; tenderness; stiffness; swelling
- Diagnostic method: X-ray; MRI scan
- Treatment: Ice; rest; non steroidal anti-inflammatory drugs; steroid injections; physical therapy; and/or surgery

Calcific bursitis refers to calcium deposits within the bursae. This most occurs in the shoulder area. The most common bursa for calcific bursitis to occur is the subacromial bursa. A bursa is a small, fluid-filled sac that reduces friction, and facilitates movements between its adjacent tissues (i.e., between tendon and bone, two muscles or skin and bone). Inflammation of the bursae is called bursitis.

== Signs and symptoms ==
- Pain during rest
- Tenderness on palpation
- Stiffness (reducing joint range of motion)
- Swelling

== Causes ==
Calcific bursitis may be related to:

- Calcific tendinitis. Sometimes calcium deposits of the involved tendons penetrate into the bursae.
- Chronic bursitis. Lack of bursitis treatment or repetitive bursitis may lead to calcific bursitis.

== Diagnosis ==
Diagnostic methods are the following

- X-ray
- MRI scan

== Treatment ==
Management methods are the following

- Ice (in the acute stage)
- Rest (immobilization of the affected limb in the acute phase)
- Non steroidal anti-inflammatory drugs
- Injections of steroid
- Physical therapy
- Surgical treatment

== See also ==
- Bursitis
- Calcific tendinitis
