= Supra-acromial bursa =

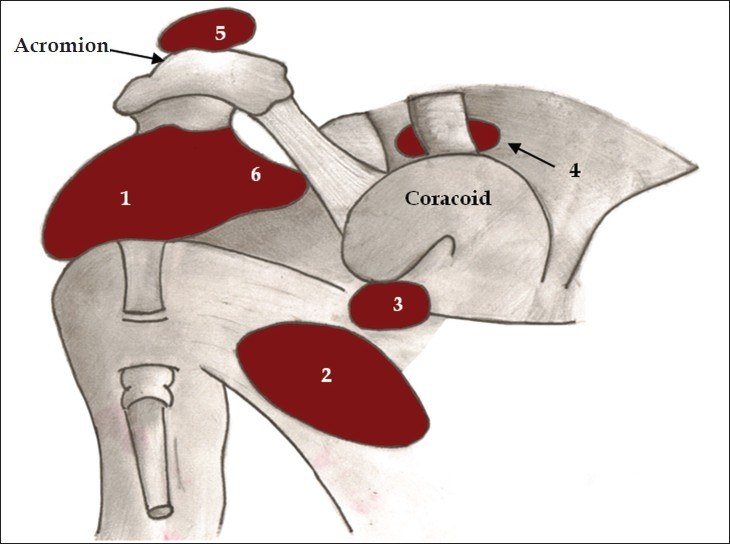
Diagram of normal bursae surrounding the shoulder joint: (1) subacromial-subdeltoid bursa, (2) subscapular recess, (3) subcoracoid bursa, (4) coracoclavicular bursa, (5) supra-acromial bursa and (6) medial extension of subacromial-subdeltoid bursa.

The supra-acromial bursa is located on the superior aspect of the acromion and normally does not communicate with the glenohumeral joint. Supra-acromial bursitis has not been receiving much attention from literature and remains described mainly as case reports of presumptive diagnosis with no histopathological correlation. Since the bursa is supra-acromial, not supraclavicular, fluid-filled masses located over the acromioclavicular joint or distal clavicle do not correspond to supra-acromial bursitis.

== See also ==
- Subacromial bursa
- Subcoracoid bursa
