= Acromioplasty =

- Specialty: Orthopaedic

Acromioplasty is an arthroscopic surgical procedure involving the acromion, a bony process of the shoulder blade.

Generally, it implies removal of a small piece of the surface of the acromion that is in contact with a tendon of the rotator cuff causing, by friction, damage to the tendon.

The procedure has been used to treat rotator cuff tears and impingement syndrome, although its benefits have been debated.
