= Subacromial bursitis =

- Shoulder joint
- Specialty: Rheumatology

Subacromial bursitis is a condition caused by inflammation of the bursa that separates the superior surface of the supraspinatus tendon (one of the four tendons of the rotator cuff) from the overlying coraco-acromial ligament, acromion, and coracoid (the acromial arch) and from the deep surface of the deltoid muscle. The subacromial bursa helps the motion of the supraspinatus tendon of the rotator cuff in activities such as overhead work.

Musculoskeletal complaints are one of the most common reasons for primary care office visits, and rotator cuff disorders are the most common source of shoulder pain.

Primary inflammation of the subacromial bursa is relatively rare and may arise from autoimmune inflammatory conditions such as rheumatoid arthritis, crystal deposition disorders such as gout or pseudogout, calcific loose bodies, and infection. More commonly, subacromial bursitis arises as a result of complex factors, thought to cause shoulder impingement symptoms. These factors are broadly classified as intrinsic (intratendinous) or extrinsic (extratendinous). They are further divided into primary or secondary causes of impingement. Secondary causes are thought to be part of another process such as shoulder instability or nerve injury.

In 1983 Neer described three stages of impingement syndrome. He noted that "the symptoms and physical signs in all three stages of impingement are almost identical, including the 'impingement sign'..., arc of pain, crepitus, and varying weakness". The Neer classification did not distinguish between partial-thickness and full-thickness rotator cuff tears in stage III. This has led to some controversy about the ability of physical examination tests to accurately diagnose between bursitis, impingement, impingement with or without rotator cuff tear and impingement with partial versus complete tears.

In 2005, Park et al. published their findings which concluded that a combination of clinical tests were more useful than a single physical examination test. For the diagnosis of impingement disease, the best combination of tests were "any degree (of) a positive Hawkins–Kennedy test, a positive painful arc sign, and weakness in external rotation with the arm at the side", to diagnose a full thickness rotator cuff tear, the best combination of tests, when all three are positive, were the painful arc, the drop-arm sign, and weakness in external rotation.

== Signs and symptoms ==
Subacromial bursitis often presents with a constellation of symptoms called impingement syndrome. Pain along the front and side of the shoulder is the most common symptom and may cause weakness and stiffness. If the pain resolves and weakness persists other causes should be evaluated such as a tear of the rotator cuff or a neurological problem arising from the neck or entrapment of the suprascapular nerve. The onset of pain may be sudden or gradual and may or may not be related to trauma. Night time pain, especially sleeping on the affected shoulder, is often reported. Localized redness or swelling are less common and suggest an infected subacromial bursa. Individuals affected by subacromial bursitis commonly present with concomitant shoulder problems such as arthritis, rotator cuff tendinitis, rotator cuff tears, and cervical radiculopathy (pinched nerve in neck).

Impingement may be brought on by sports activities, such as overhead throwing sports and swimming, or overhead work such as painting, carpentry, or plumbing. Activities that involve repetitive overhead activity, or directly in front, may cause shoulder pain. Direct upward pressure on the shoulder, such as leaning on an elbow, may increase pain.

== Pathophysiology ==
The literature on the pathophysiology of bursitis describes inflammation as the primary cause of symptoms. Inflammatory bursitis is usually the result of repetitive injury to the bursa. In the subacromial bursa, this generally occurs due to microtrauma to adjacent structures, particularly the supraspinatus tendon. The inflammatory process causes synovial cells to multiply, increasing collagen formation and fluid production within the bursa and reduction in the outside layer of lubrication.

Less frequently observed causes of subacromial bursitis include hemorrhagic conditions, crystal deposition and infection.

Many causes have been proposed in the medical literature for subacromial impingement syndrome. The bursa facilitates the motion of the rotator cuff beneath the arch, any disturbance of the relationship of the subacromial structures can lead to impingement. These factors can be broadly classified as intrinsic such as tendon degeneration, rotator cuff muscle weakness and overuse. Extrinsic factors include bone spurs from the acromion or AC joint, shoulder instability and neurologic problems arising outside of the shoulder.

== Diagnosis ==
It is often difficult to distinguish between pain caused by bursitis or that caused by a rotator cuff injury as both exhibit similar pain patterns in the front or side of the shoulder. Subacromial bursitis can be painful with resisted abduction due to the pinching of the bursa as the deltoid contracts. If the therapist performs a treatment direction test and gently applies joint traction or a caudal glide during abduction (MWM), the painful arc may reduce if the problem is bursitis or adhesive capsulitis (as this potentially increases the subacromial space).

The following clinical tests, if positive, may indicate bursitis:

- The patient actively abducts the arm and a painful arc occurs between 60° and 120°. This is due to the compression of the supraspinatus tendon or subacromial bursa between the anterior acromial arch and humeral head. When lowering from full abduction there is often a painful "catch" at midrange. If the patient can achieve adequate muscle relaxation, passive motion tends to be less painful.
- The patient performs an isometric flexion contraction against resistance of the therapist (Speed’s Test). When the therapist’s resistance is removed, a sudden jerking motion results and latent pain indicates a positive test for bursitis.
- Neer’s Sign: If pain occurs during forward elevation of the internally rotated arm above 90°. This will identify impingement of the rotator cuff but is also sensitive for subacromial bursitis.

Irritation or entrapment of the lower subscapular nerve, which innervates the subscapularis and teres major muscles, will produce muscle guarding at the shoulder that will restrict motion into external rotation, abduction, or flexion. The aforementioned tests will assist in diagnosing bursitis over other conditions. The diagnosis of impingement syndrome should be viewed with caution in people who are less than forty years old, because such individuals may have subtle glenohumeral instability.

=== Imaging ===
X-rays may help visualize bone spurs, acromial anatomy and arthritis. Further, calcification in the subacromial space and rotator cuff may be revealed. Osteoarthritis of the acromioclavicular (AC) joint may co-exist and is usually demonstrated on radiographs.

MRI imagining can reveal fluid accumulation in the bursa and assess adjacent structures. In chronic cases caused by impingement tendinosis and tears in the rotator cuff may be revealed. At US, an abnormal bursa may show

1. fluid distension,
2. synovial proliferation, and/or
3. thickening of the bursal walls.

In any case, the magnitude of pathological findings does not correlate with the magnitude of the symptoms.

=== Special considerations ===
In patients with bursitis who have rheumatoid arthritis, short term improvements are not taken as a sign of resolution and may require long term treatment to ensure recurrence is minimized. Joint contracture of the shoulder has also been found to be at a higher incidence in type two diabetics, which may lead to frozen shoulder (Donatelli, 2004).

== Treatment ==
Many non-operative treatments have been advocated, including rest; oral administration of non-steroidal anti-inflammatory drugs; physical therapy; chiropractic; and local modalities such as cryotherapy, ultrasound, electromagnetic radiation, and subacromial injection of corticosteroids.

Shoulder bursitis rarely requires surgical intervention and generally responds favorably to conservative treatment. Surgery is reserved for patients who fail to respond to non-operative measures. Minimally invasive surgical procedures such as arthroscopic removal of the bursa allows for direct inspection of the shoulder structures and provides the opportunity for removal of bone spurs and repair of any rotator cuff tears that may be found.

=== Early / initial ===
Initial phase of physiotherapy rehabilitation
Goals of treatment	Reduce inflammation; Reduce pain; Prevent weakness and atrophy of muscles as a result of disuse; Increase the patient’s awareness of bursitis; Prevent/reduce impingement and further tissue damage		
	Treatment	Justification	
Advice and education	Educate the patient about their condition and advise to avoid painful activities and the importance of relative rest of the shoulder	Prevention of pain and impingement which delays the healing process	
Advice and education	Educate the patient about the importance of correct posture	Puts muscles in the optimal length tension relationship, reducing impingement	
Manual therapy	Grade 1 and 2 accessory mobilisations of the glenohumeral joint	Has a neurophysiological effect reducing pain and improving synovial fluid flow, improving healing	
Manual therapy	Soft tissue massage	Lengthens tight muscles and reduces muscle spasm	
Therapeutic exercise	Gentle pendulum range of motion exercises	Maintenance of range of motion and prevention of adhesive capsulitis	
Therapeutic exercise	Scapular exercises such as shoulder shrugs and shoulder retraction exercises	Improve muscular control and scapular coordination	
Therapeutic exercise	Centering of humeral head	Helps to facilitate adequate muscle timing and recruitment	
Therapeutic exercise	Stretching of tight muscles such as the levator scapulae, pectoralis major, subscapularis and upper trapezius muscle	To lengthen tight muscles which may improve scapulohumeral rhythm, posture and increase the subacromial space	
Therapeutic exercise	Rotator cuff strengthening - isometric contractions in neutral and 30 degrees abduction	Improves rotator cuff strength which is integral to the stability of the shoulder and functional activities	
Electrophysical modalities	Ice	To reduce inflammation and pain	elevate
Electrophysical modalities	Low intensity pulsed ultrasound (3 megaHz)	To reduce inflammation and facilitate healing	
External physical aids	May use head of humerus repositioning tape	To maintain the head of humerus in its central position for optimal muscle recruitment	

=== Middle / intermittent ===
Intermittent phase of physiotherapy rehabilitation
Goals of treatment	Improve muscle control; Improve scapulohumeral rhythm; Improve active and passive range of motion; Restore strength of scapular and rotator cuff muscles	
	Treatment	Justification
Advice and education	Advise the patient that they must perform all activities and exercises pain free	To prevent reinjury and damage to the bursa
Manual therapy	Grade 3 and 4 accessory mobilizations of the glenohumeral joint	Improves range of motion and increases synovial fluid movement, improving healing
Manual therapy	Proprioceptive neuromuscular facilitation (PNF) in functional diagonal patterns	Strengthens muscles, improves motor control and scapulohumeral rhythm
Manual therapy	Mobilization with movement e.g. caudal glide with active abduction	Improves range of motion and decreases pain
Therapeutic exercise	Specific muscle strengthening exercises especially for scapular stabilization (serratus anterior, rhomboids and lower trapezius muscles) e.g. strengthening lower trapezius muscle - bilateral external rotation using a theraband, strengthening of serratus anterior, punching with theraband resistance	Improves stability during scapular motion which may decrease impingement of the bursa in the subacromial space.
Therapeutic exercise	Active assisted range of motion - creeping the hand up the wall in abduction, scaption and flexion and door pulley manoeuvre	Help to improve active range of motion and gravity assists with shoulder depression
Therapeutic exercise	Active internal and external rotator exercises with the use of a bar or a theraband	Improves strength of rotator cuff and improves mobility in internal and external rotation
Electrophysical modalities	Heat	Improves muscle extensibility
Electrophysical modalities	Low intensity pulsed ultrasound (3 megaHz)	Facilitates healing
External physical aids	May use head of humerus repositioning tape if necessary	To maintain the head of humerus in its optimal position for optimal muscle recruitment

=== Late / return to function ===
Return to function phase of physiotherapy rehabilitation
Goals of treatment	Return the patient to their previous level of function; Achieve full active and passive range of motion	
	Treatment	Justification
Education and advice	Education about the importance of a home based exercise program in the late stage of rehabilitation	Ensures patient compliance
Education and advice	Correction of techniques performed	Ensures that the correct target muscles are being used
Education and advice	Education to ensure that the patient performs activities and exercises within pain free limits	This reduces the chance that the patient may work too hard and cause reinjury
Manual therapy	PNF functional patterns with increasing resistance	Continues to strengthen muscles, improves motor control and scapulohumeral rhythm
Therapeutic exercise	Exercises specific for the patient’s functional needs e.g. functional reaching	To improve the patients functional ability
Therapeutic exercise	Proprioception exercises e.g. Wall push ups with the hands resting on medicine balls or dura disks	Improves proprioception important to reduce reinjury as return to function/sport
Therapeutic exercise	Strengthen the shoulder elevators – deltoid, flexors and also latissimus dorsi.	Important in this phase of the rehabilitation following strengthening of the shoulder depressors
Therapeutic exercise	Progress strengthening exercises to incorporate speed and load to make more functional	Adding speed and load to exercises ensures that the patient is prepared for more functional tasks and activities
Electrophysical modalities	Ice after exercise	May assist to reduce any inflammation post exercise
External physical aids	May use head of humerus repositioning tape if necessary	May assist with return to function

== Prognosis ==
In 1997 Morrison et al published a study that reviewed the cases of 616 patients (636 shoulders) with impingement syndrome (painful arc of motion) to assess the outcome of non-surgical care. An attempt was made to exclude patients who were suspected of having additional shoulder conditions such as, full-thickness tears of the rotator cuff, degenerative arthritis of the acromioclavicular joint, instability of the glenohumeral joint, or adhesive capsulitis. All patients were managed with anti-inflammatory medication and a specific, supervised physical-therapy regimen. The patients were followed up from six months to over six years. They found that

- 67% (413 patients) of the patients improved, 28% did not improve and went to surgical treatment, and 5% did not improve and declined further treatment.
- Of the 413 patients who improved, 74 had a recurrence of symptoms during the observation period and their symptoms responded to rest or after resumption of the exercise program.
- Younger patients (20 years or less) and patients between 41 and 60 years of age, fared better than those who were in the 21 to 40 years age group. This may be related to the peak incidence of work, job requirements, sports and hobby related activities, that may place greater demands on the shoulder.
- Patients who were older than sixty years of age had the "poorest results". This was thought to be potentially related to "undiagnosed full-thickness tears of the rotator cuff". It is known that the rotator cuff and adjacent structures undergo degenerative changes with ageing.

Most patients improve with conservative therapy, and experience symptoms for only a few weeks.
