= Shoulder impingement syndrome =

- Other names: Subacromial impingement, painful arc syndrome, supraspinatus syndrome, swimmer's shoulder, thrower's shoulder
- Shoulder joint
- Specialty: Orthopedics, sports medicine

Shoulder impingement syndrome is a syndrome involving tendonitis (inflammation of tendons) of the rotator cuff muscles as they pass through the subacromial space, the passage beneath the acromion. It is particularly associated with tendonitis of the supraspinatus muscle. This can result in pain, weakness, and loss of movement at the shoulder.

== Signs and symptoms ==
The most common symptoms in impingement syndrome are pain, weakness and a loss of movement at the affected shoulder. The pain is often worsened by shoulder overhead movement and may occur at night, especially when lying on the affected shoulder. The onset of the pain may be acute if due to an injury or insidious if due to a gradual process such as an osteoarthritic spur. The pain has been described as dull rather than sharp, and lingers for long periods of time, making it hard to fall asleep. Other symptoms can include a grinding or popping sensation during movement of the shoulder.

The range of motion at the shoulder may be limited by pain. A painful arc of movement may be present during forward elevation of the arm from 60° to 120°. Passive movement at the shoulder will appear painful when a downward force is applied at the acromion but the pain will ease once the force is removed.

== Causes ==
When the arm is raised, the subacromial space (gap between the anterior edge of the acromion and the head of the humerus) narrows; the supraspinatus muscle tendon passes through this space. Anything that causes further narrowing has the tendency to impinge the tendon and cause an inflammatory response, resulting in impingement syndrome.

Acromion types
Type	Appearance	Prevalence	Angle of anterior slope
Flat		17.1%	13.18
Curved		42.9%	29.98
Hooked		39.3%	26.98

Such causes can be bony structures such as subacromial spurs (bony projections from the acromion), osteoarthritic spurs on the acromioclavicular joint, and variations in the shape of the acromion. Thickening or calcification of the coracoacromial ligament can also cause impingement. Loss of function of the rotator cuff muscles, due to injury or loss of strength, may cause the humerus to move superiorly, resulting in impingement. Inflammation and subsequent thickening of the subacromial bursa may also cause impingement.

Weight training exercises where the arms are elevated above shoulder height but in an internally rotated position such as the upright row have been suggested as a cause of subacromial impingement. Another common cause of Impingement syndrome is restrictions in the range movement of the scapulo-thoracic surfaces. Commonly, one or more ribs between rib 2 and rib 7/8 on the side of the impingement may jut out slightly and/or feel hard when the person springs on it or them. When this occurs, the scapula is raised and anteverted (angled forwards). This in turn pushes the acromion and the humeral head out of its usual anatomical position placing pressure downwards at the head of the humerus at the position of the nerve thus causing the impingement syndrome. This is visibly demonstrated by a slightly raised and protracted shoulder girdle. Note: the humerus anteverts in this position causing a more protrusive section of the humerus to press upwards towards the acromion. Sleeping with the arm in the overhead position can cause shoulder impingement and may account for shoulder symptoms in those ordinarily not considered to be at risk. This position begins in infancy and continues throughout one’s life. Since we are unconscious at night, this is rarely recognized as a cause of shoulder impingement. Impingement (pinching) of the rotator cuff tendon every night causes injury to the cells of the rotator cuff tendon and some cells may die. Over time, very few cells may be left to hold the rotator cuff together resulting in a complete tear of this tendon with minimal trauma. When the cells die, the contents of the cell are released locally. Some of these contents are chemicals that are toxic to the surrounding tissues (nociceptive). This may cause spasm and pain in the adjacent muscle of the rotator cuff, the supraspinatus muscle. This shoulder muscle is between the shoulder and the base of the neck and is a likely cause of common chronic neck pain. This can easily be treated by keeping the arm down at one’s side at night, and not overhead.

== Mechanism ==
The scapula plays an important role in shoulder impingement syndrome. It is a wide, flat bone lying on the posterior thoracic wall that provides an attachment for three different groups of muscles. The intrinsic muscles of the scapula include the muscles of the rotator cuff- the subscapularis, infraspinatus, teres minor and supraspinatus. These muscles attach to the surface of the scapula and are responsible for the internal and external rotation of the glenohumeral joint, along with humeral abduction. The extrinsic muscles include the biceps, triceps, and deltoid muscles and attach to the coracoid process and supraglenoid tubercle of the scapula, infraglenoid tubercle of the scapula, and spine of the scapula. These muscles are responsible for several actions of the glenohumeral joint. The third group, which is mainly responsible for stabilization and rotation of the scapula, consists of the trapezius, serratus anterior, levator scapulae, and rhomboid muscles and attach to the medial, superior, and inferior borders of the scapula. Each of these muscles has its own role in shoulder function and must be in balance with the others in order to avoid shoulder pathology.

The combined movement of glenohumeral joint and scapulothoracic joint is called as scapulohumeral rhythm. During shoulder elevation two-third of movement occurs at glenohumeral joint and one-third at scapulothoracic. This coupling movements maintain glenoid fossa.

Abnormal scapular function is called scapular dyskinesis. One action the scapula performs during a throwing or serving motion is elevation of the acromion process in order to avoid impingement of the rotator cuff tendons. If the scapula fails to properly elevate the acromion, impingement may occur during the cocking and acceleration phase of an overhead activity. The two muscles most commonly inhibited during this first part of an overhead motion are the serratus anterior and the lower trapezius. These two muscles act as a force couple within the glenohumeral joint to properly elevate the acromion process, and if a muscle imbalance exists, shoulder impingement may develop.

The scapula may also be misplaced if a rib deep to it is not moving correctly. Often in the case of Shoulder impingement syndrome, the scapula may be anteverted such that the shoulder on the affected side appears protracted. The ribs that may cause such an anteversion of the scapula include ribs 2–8.

== Diagnosis ==
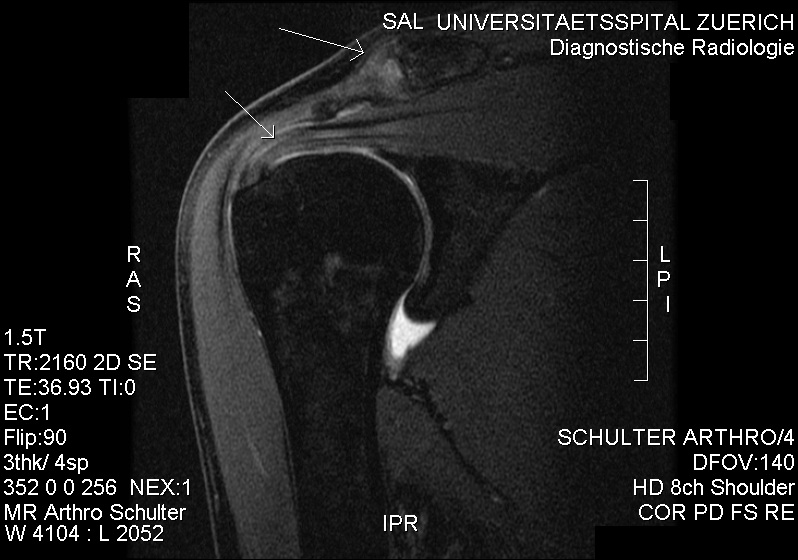
MRI showing subacromial impingement with partial rupture of the supraspinatus tendon, but no retraction or fatty degeneration of the supraspinatus muscle.

Impingement syndrome can be diagnosed by a targeted medical history and physical examination, but it has also been argued that at least medical imaging (generally X-ray initially) and/or response to local anesthetic injection is necessary for workup. However, imaging studies are unable to show cause of shoulder pain in diagnosing. For example, MRI imaging would show rotator cuff pathology and bursitis but is unable to specify the cause.

On physical exam, the physician may twist or elevate the patient's arm to test for reproducible pain (the Neer sign and Hawkins-Kennedy test). These tests help localize the pathology to the rotator cuff; however, they are not specific for impingement. Neer sign may also be seen with subacromial bursitis.

=== Response to local anesthetic ===
The physician may inject lidocaine (usually combined with a steroid) into the bursa, and if there is an improved range of motion and decrease in pain, this is considered a positive "Impingement Test". It not only supports the diagnosis for impingement syndrome, but it is also therapeutic.

=== Imaging ===
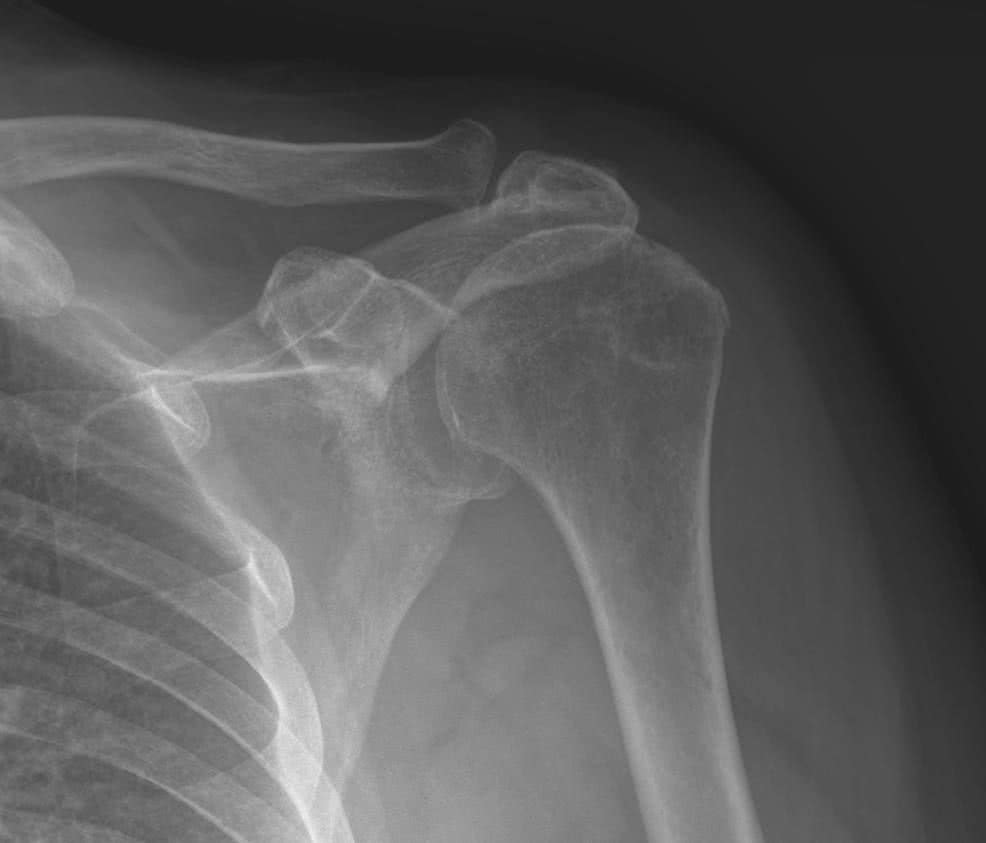
Shoulder impingement syndrome. Frontal X-ray of left shoulder.

Plain x-rays of the shoulder can be used to detect some joint pathology and variations in the bones, including acromioclavicular arthritis, variations in the acromion, and calcification. However, x-rays do not allow visualization of soft tissue and thus hold a low diagnostic value. Ultrasonography, arthrography and MRI can be used to detect rotator cuff muscle pathology. MRI is the best imaging test prior to arthroscopic surgery. Due to lack of understanding of the pathoaetiology, and lack of diagnostic accuracy in the assessment process by many physicians, several opinions are recommended before intervention.

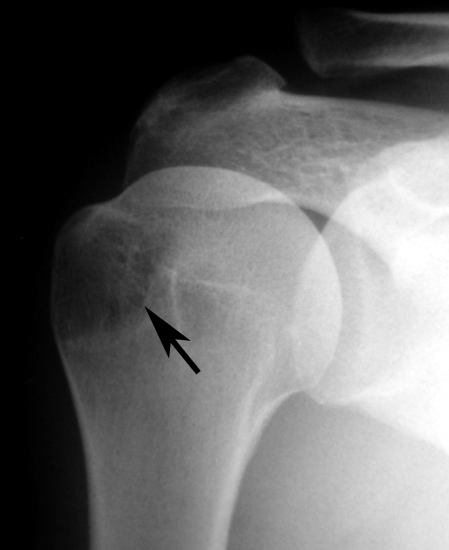
proximal humeral pseudocyst

Plain x-rays of the shoulder may show a “proximal humeral pseudocyst”. This localized area of bone atrophy is the result of increased blood circulation which demineralizes the bone at the attachment of the rotator cuff tendon. It is evidence of chronic inflammation of the rotator cuff. Chronic shoulder inflammation is frequently asymptomatic, and this cystic appearance may be the only evidence of an inflammation.

== Treatment ==
Impingement syndrome is usually treated conservatively, but sometimes it is treated with arthroscopic surgery or open surgery. Conservative treatment includes rest, cessation of painful activity, and physical therapy. Physical therapy treatments would typically focus at maintaining range of movement, improving posture, strengthening shoulder muscles, and reduction of pain. NSAIDs and ice packs may be used for pain relief.

Therapeutic exercises might be favorable intervention compared to passive treatment approaches, electrotherapy and placebo. A recent meta-analysis done on rotator cuff tendinopathy has shown that nearly all types of active resistance training programs were proven to be effective in improving pain and shoulder function with no significant differences among the different exercise types, further cementing the favorability of a more active intervention over passive modalities when it comes to rotator cuff issues. Exercises may help to regain the scapulo-humeral rhythm and scapular control which may reduce pain.

It is important to avoid the overhead position since this causes impingement. This is especially important at night since most people sleep like this even if they are unaware of their sleep position since they are unconscious

=== Steroids ===
Therapeutic injections of corticosteroid and local anaesthetic may be used for persistent impingement syndrome. The total number of injections is generally limited to three due to possible side effects from the corticosteroid. A 2017 review found corticosteroid injections only give small and transient pain relief.

=== Surgery ===
A number of surgical interventions are available, depending on the nature and location of the pathology. Surgery may be done arthroscopically or as open surgery. The impinging structures may be removed in surgery, and the subacromial space may be widened by resection of the distal clavicle and excision of osteophytes on the under-surface of the acromioclavicular joint. Damaged rotator cuff muscles can be surgically repaired.

A 2019 review found that the evidence does not support decompression surgery in those with more than 3 months of shoulder pain without a history of trauma. A recent metaanalysis has further supported that early SIS would likely benefit from non-operative treatment modalities and surgical open decompression should be considered only with chronic presentation.

== History ==
Impingement syndrome was reported in 1852. Impingement of the shoulder was previously thought to be precipitated by shoulder abduction and surgical intervention focused on lateral or total acromionectomy. In 1972, Charles Neer proposed that impingement was due to the anterior third of the acromion and the coracoacromial ligament and suggested surgery should be focused on these areas. The role of anteriorinferior aspect of the acromion in impingement syndrome and excision of parts of the anteriorinferior acromion has become a pivotal part of the surgical treatment of the syndrome.

== Criticism ==
Subacromial impingement is not free of criticism. First, the identification of acromion type shows poor intra- and inter-observer reliability. Second, a computerized three-dimensional study failed to support impingement by any portion of the acromion on the rotator cuff tendons in different shoulder positions. Third, most partial-thickness cuff tears do not occur on bursal surface fibers, where mechanical abrasion from the acromion does occur. Fourth, it has been suggested that bursal surface cuff tears could be responsible for subacromial spurs and not the opposite. Fifth, it has been shown that there is no association with acromiohumeral distance, measured at 0°, 45° and 60° of shoulder abduction, with people with subacromial pain syndrome and shoulder pain. And finally, there is growing evidence that routine acromioplasty may not be required for successful rotator cuff repair, which would be an unexpected finding if acromial shape had a major role in generating tendon lesions. In summary, despite being a popular theory, the bulk of evidence suggest that subacromial impingement probably does not play a dominant role in many cases of rotator cuff disease.

== See also ==
- Milwaukee shoulder syndrome

== Sources ==
- Habermeyer, Peter; Magosch, Petra; Lichtenberg, Sven (2006). Classifications and Scores of the Shoulder. Heidelberg: Springer. ISBN 978-3-540-24350-2.
