= Acromial angle =

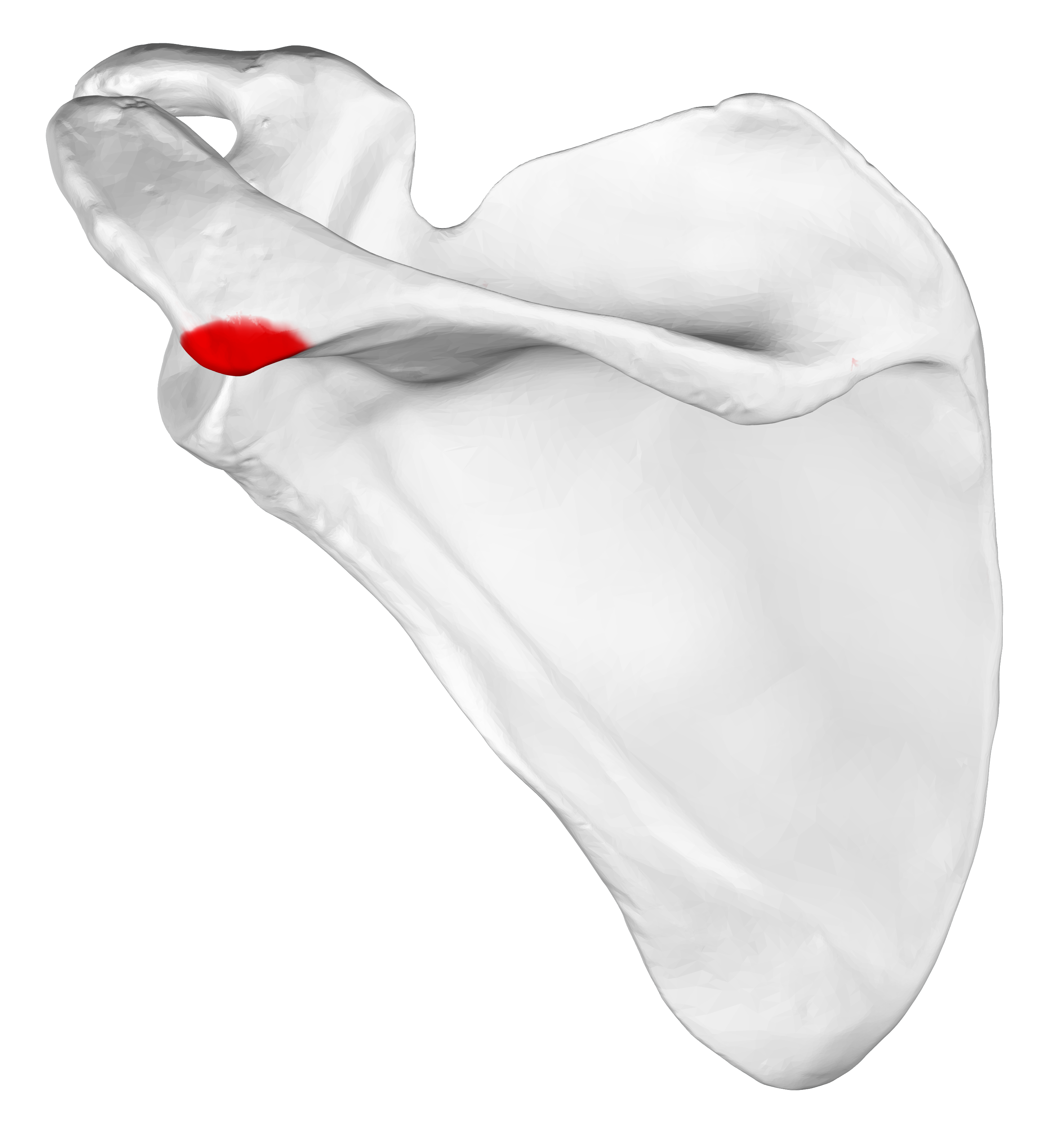
- Left scapula. Posterior view. Acromional angle shown in red.

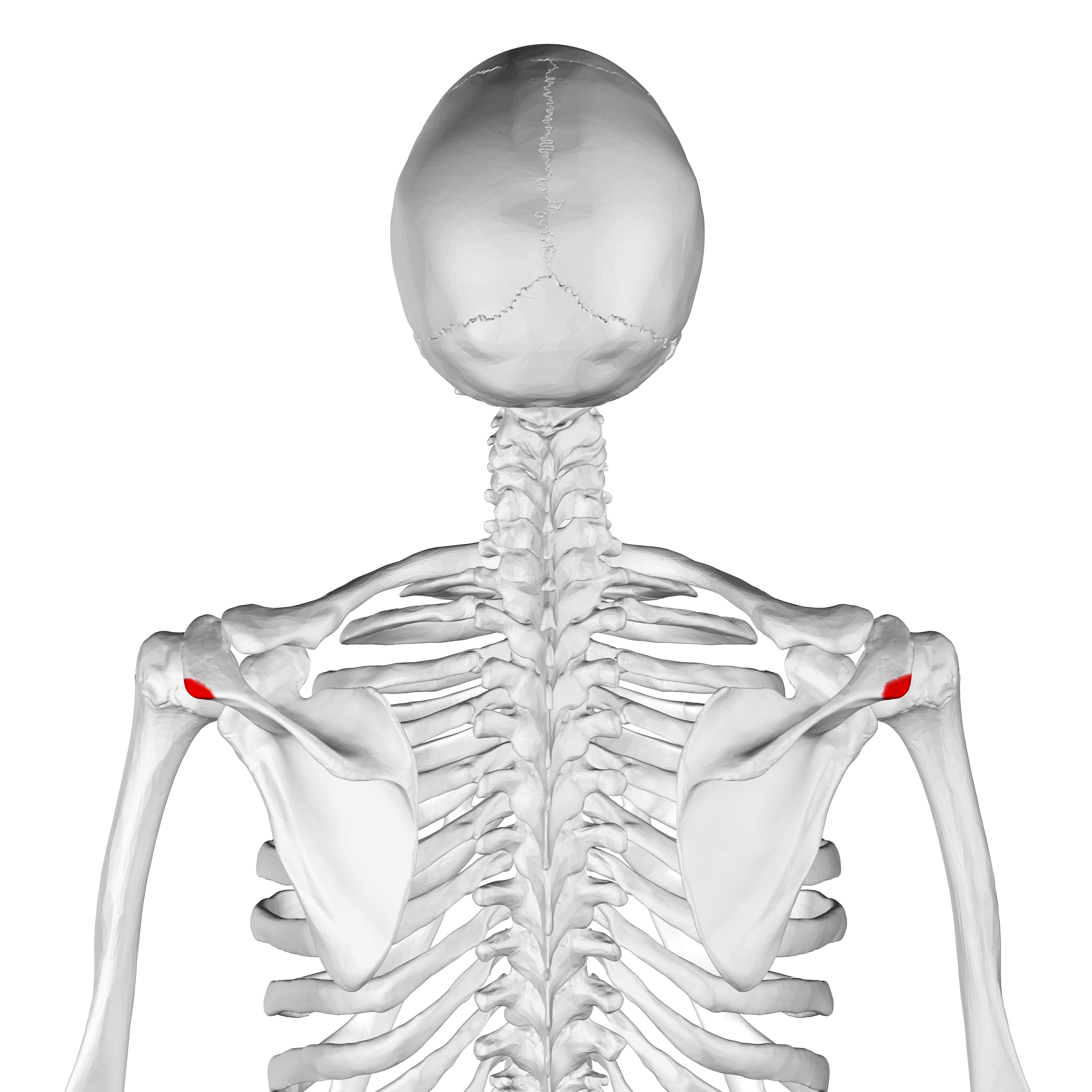
- Posterior view. Acromional angle shown in red.

Details

Identifiers
- Latin: Angulus acromialis
- TA98: A02.4.01.011
- TA2: 1154
- FMA: 23257

Acromial angle is a prominent bony point at the junction of the lateral border of acromion and the spine of scapula.

== Additional images ==
Left scapula. Animation. Acromial angle is shown in red.

Position of acromial angle (shown in red). Animation.

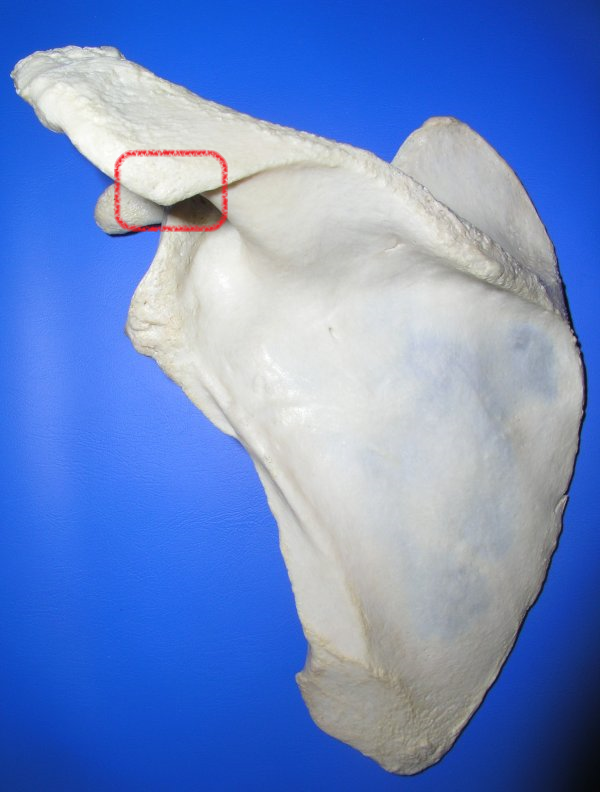
Left scapula. Posterior view. Acromional angle labeled in red.

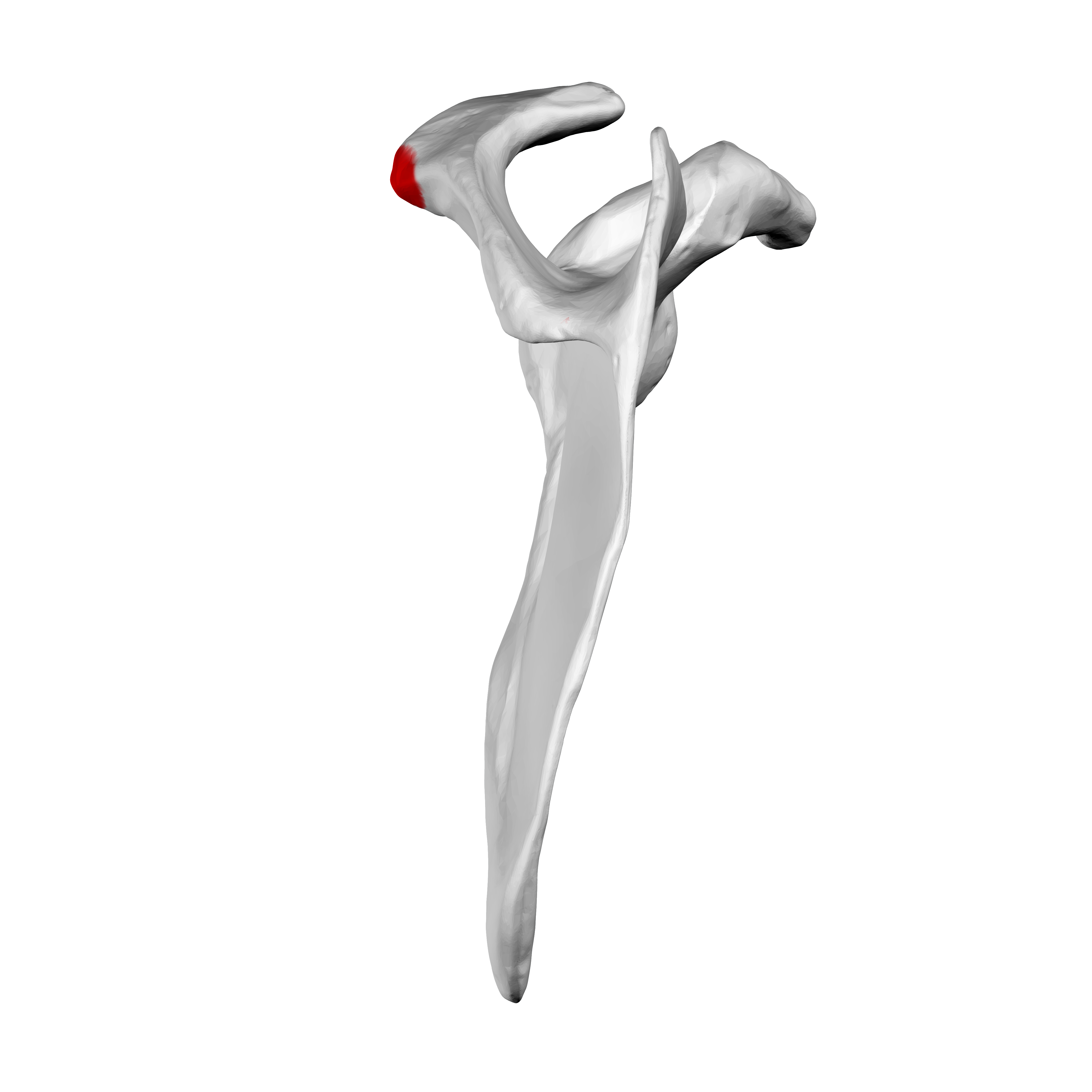
Medial view of left scapula. Acromional angle shown in red.

== See also ==
- Acromion
- Spine of scapula
