= Calcific tendinitis =

Disorder characterized by calcium deposits in a tendon

- Other names: calcified/calcareous tendinitis/tendinopathy, tendinosis calcarea, hydroxyapatite deposition disease, calcific periarthritis
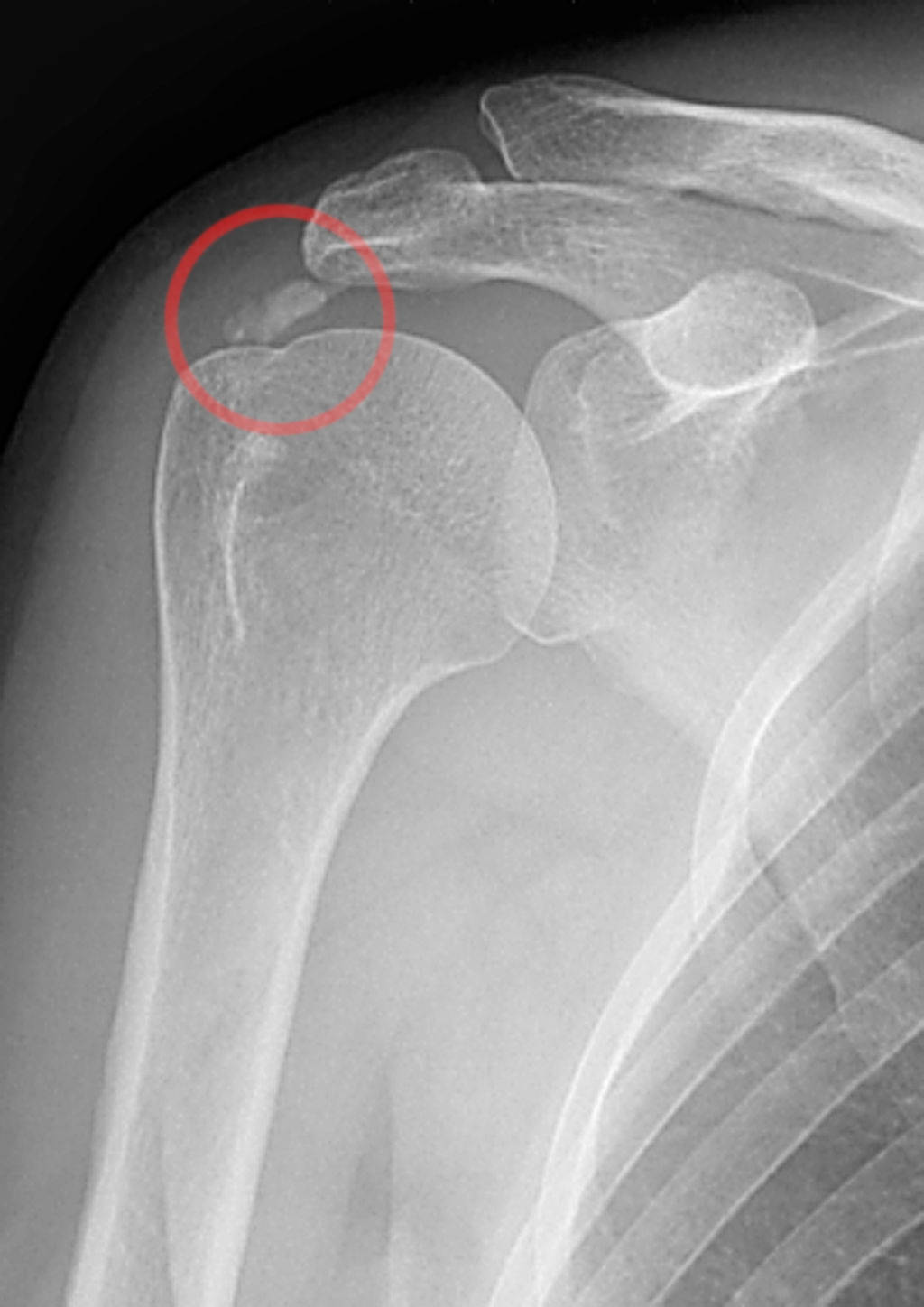
- A plain X ray of the shoulder showing calcific tendinitis
- Specialty: Rheumatology
- Symptoms: Chronic shoulder pain during activities; acute shoulder pain
- Duration: Self-limiting, typically resolves in 6-9 months
- Risk factors: Diabetes, hypothyroidism
- Diagnostic method: X-ray
- Treatment: Physiotherapy, extracorporeal shockwave therapy, surgical excision
- Medication: NSAIDs

Calcific tendinitis is a common and expected aspect of tendinopathy or enthesopathy where deposits of calcium phosphate form in a tendon or enthesis. Calcium in a tendon or enthesis is seen on radiographs (X-ray imaging).

Calcification in soft tissues is associated with acute inflammation on uncommon occasions, a condition referred to as acute calcific tendinitis. It’s important to distinguish acute calcific tendinitis from the very common calcium deposits in tendinopathy and enthesopathy.

The symptoms of acute calcific tendinitis can mimic infection: intense pain, and warmth, redness and swelling in superficial sites. The symptoms from acute calcific tendinitis resolve spontaneously over a few weeks. The calcium is typically amorphous on radiographs in acute calcific tendinitis and often disappears after the inflammation resolves. Treatment with non-steroidal anti-inflammatory drugs can alleviate pain.

Calcifications in the rotator cuff were first described by Ernest Codman in 1934. The name, "calcifying tendinitis" was coined by Henry Plenk in 1952.

== Signs and symptoms ==
Calcification is an integral part of tendinopathy. In acute calcific tendinitis the calcium deposit is breaking down, and people experience severe acute pain. Those affected tend to hold the shoulder rotated inwards to alleviate pain. Some people experience heat and redness at the affected shoulder. Motion is very painful.

== Cause ==
The pathophysiology of tendinopathy is mucoid degeneration, part of which is chondroid metaplasia of the fibroblasts. Chondroid metaplasia means the fibroblasts are acting like cartilage cells (chondrocytes). Fibroblasts that are acting like chondrocytes can deposit calcium into the soft tissues as they do in bone. Calcification in the tendons is a common component of tendinopathy.

The calcification consists of calcium phosphate. These deposits are common in rotator cuff tendinopathy and are most frequently found in the supraspinatus tendon (63% of the time), and less frequently in the infraspinatus tendon (7%), subacromial bursa (7%), subscapularis tendon (3%), or in both the supraspinatus and subscapularis tendons at the same time (20%).

== Diagnosis ==
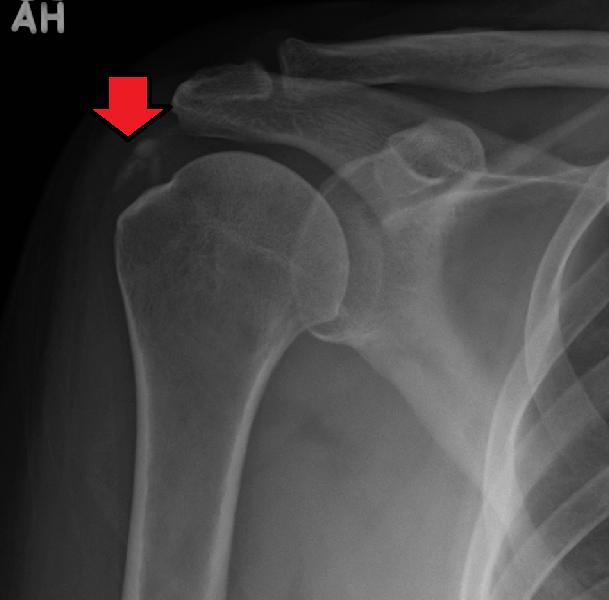
An x-ray showing calcific deposits in the area of the tendons of the rotator cuff muscles

Acute calcific tendinitis is typically diagnosed by physical examination and X-ray imaging. When calcium deposits for in the setting of tendinopathy there is typically uniform density and a clear margin. In the setting of acute calcific tendinitis, calcium deposits may appear cloudy and with unclear margins. By arthroscopy, calcium deposits in tendinopathy are common and appear crystalline and chalk-like. In acute calcific tendinitis, deposits appear smooth resembling toothpaste. Ultrasound is also used to locate and assess calcium deposits. In the setting of tendinopathy, deposits are hyperechoic and arc-shaped; in acute calcific tendinitis deposits are less echogenic and appear fragmented.

== Treatment ==
The natural history of acute calcific tendinitis is resolution over a few weeks.

Symptom alleviation during this process can include nonsteroidal anti-inflammatory drugs to alleviate pain. Movement is helpful to avoid joint stiffness. For those with severe pain direct injections of steroids to the affected site can be considered, but may interfere with reabsorption of the calcium deposit.

It’s important to consider treatments to remove calcium separately. Given that calcification is an expected and very common variation of tendinopathy, the role of removal of calcium is debatable. Those who advocate for offering removal of calcium in the setting of tendinopathy suggest that for those whose pain doesn't improve with medication, the deposit can be dissolved and removed with techniques called "ultrasound-guided needling", "barbotage", and "US-PICT" (for "ultrasound percutaneous injection in calcific tendinitis"). In each, ultrasound is used to locate the deposit and guide a needle to the affected site. There saline and lidocaine are injected to dissolve the deposit, then removed to wash it away. Another treatment option is extracorporeal shockwave therapy, where pulses of sound are used to break up the deposit and promote healing. There is little standardization of energy levels, duration, and time interval of treatment; though most studies report positive outcomes with low- to medium-energy waves (below 0.28 mJ/mm^{2}).

Surgery for calcium in tendinopathy is also debatable. Advocates recommended consideration of surgery once 6 months of symptoms. The surgery offered is typically arthroscopic and involves calcification removal. Even among advocates of offering removal of calcification, there is debate regarding whether a complete removal of the deposits is necessary, or if equal pain relief can be obtained from a partial removal of calcium deposits.

== Outcomes ==
Acute calcific tendinitis resolves predictably over a few weeks. Persistent symptoms from the underlying tendinopathy are expected. Treatment helps alleviate pain, but long-term follow-up studies have shown that people recover with or without treatment.

== Epidemiology ==
Calcific tendinitis typically occurs in adults aged 30 to 50, and is rare in those older than 70. It is twice as common in women as men.

Risk factors that increase the chance of developing calcific tendinitis include; hormonal disorders, like diabetes and hypothyroidism, autoimmune disorders, like rheumatoid arthritis, and metabolic disorders that also cause kidney stones, gallstones, and gout. Occupations that consist of repetitive overhead lifting, such as athletes or construction workers, do not seem to significantly increase the likelihood of developing calcific tendinitis.

== History ==
Calcifications in the rotator cuff tendon were first described by Ernest Codman in his 1934 book The Shoulder. In 1952, in his study on x-ray therapy for people with such calcifications, Henry Plenk coined the term "calcifying tendinitis".
