= Subcoracoid bursa =

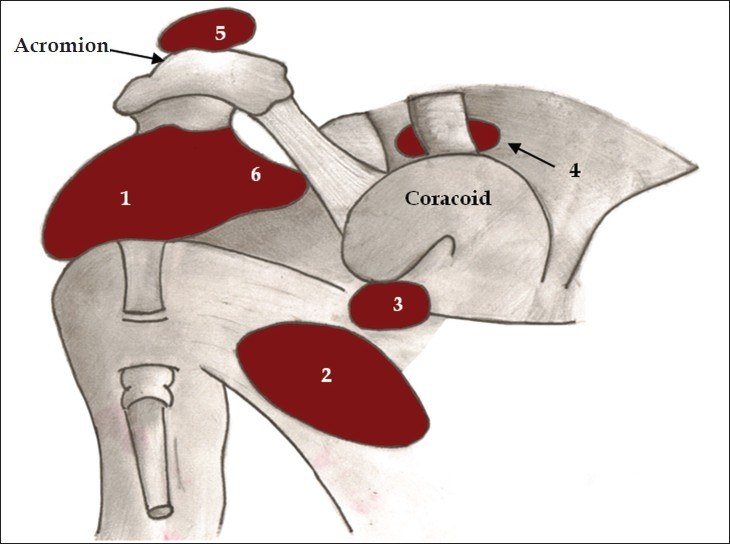
- Diagram of normal bursae surrounding the shoulder joint: (1) subacromial-subdeltoid bursa, (2) subscapular recess, (3) subcoracoid bursa, (4) coracoclavicular bursa, (5) supra-acromial bursa and (6) medial extension of subacromial-subdeltoid bursa.

Details

Identifiers
- Latin: bursa subcoracoidea

The subcoracoid bursa or subcoracoid bursa of Collas is a synovial bursa located in the shoulder.

It is located anterior to the subscapularis muscle and inferior to the coracoid process. Its function is to reduce friction between the coracobrachialis, subscapularis and short head of the biceps tendons, thus facilitating internal and external rotation of the shoulder. The subcoracoid bursa does not communicate with the glenohumeral joint under normal circumstances, but may communicate with the subacromial bursa. As such, contrast fluid injected into the glenohumeral joint during an arthrogram that extends into the subcoracoid bursa is abnormal, and indirectly implies a full thickness rotator cuff tear.
