= Subacromial bursa =

Synovial cavity

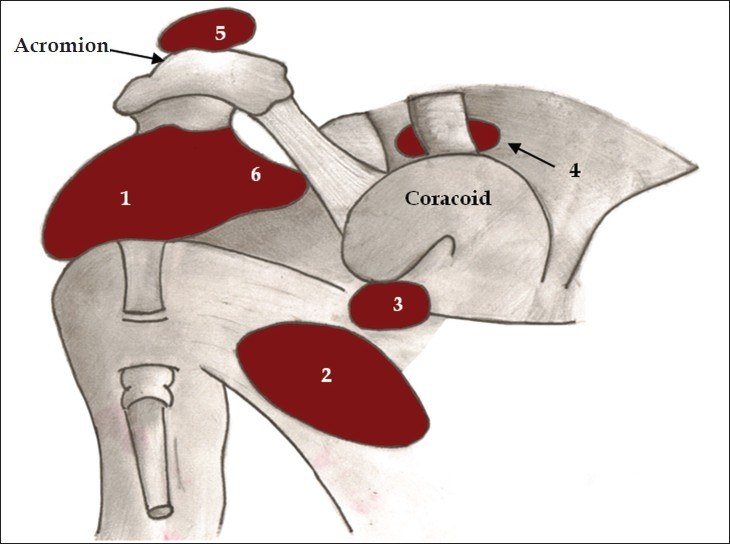
- Diagram of normal bursae surrounding the shoulder joint: (1) subacromial-subdeltoid bursa, (2) subscapular recess, (3) subcoracoid bursa, (4) coracoclavicular bursa, (5) supra-acromial bursa and (6) medial extension of subacromial-subdeltoid bursa.

Details

Identifiers
- Latin: bursa subacromialis
- TA98: A04.8.03.004
- TA2: 2557
- FMA: 35515

The subacromial bursa is the synovial cavity located just below the acromion, which communicates with the subdeltoid bursa in most individuals, forming the so-called subacromial-subdeltoid bursa (SSB).

The SSB is located deep to the deltoid muscle and the coracoacromial arch and extends laterally beyond the humeral attachment of the rotator cuff, anteriorly to overlie the intertubercular groove, medially to the acromioclavicular joint, and posteriorly over the rotator cuff. The SSB decreases friction, and allows free motion of the rotator cuff relative to the coracoacromial arch and the deltoid muscle.

French anatomist and surgeon Jean-François Jarjavay is credited as the first to describe morbid processes of the SSB in 1867. Since then, histologic studies have documented that synovial membrane may undergo inflammatory and/or degenerative changes and many now believe that they correspond to different stages in the spectrum of disease, with long-lasting inflammation leading to degeneration and fibrosis.

== See also ==
- Subacromial bursitis
- Subcoracoid bursa
- Supra-acromial bursa

== Sources ==
- Wheeless, Clifford. "Subacromial Bursa".
