= Empty can/Full can tests =

Medical diagnoses

- Purpose: diagnose shoulder injuries

The empty can test (Jobe's test) and full can test are used to diagnose shoulder injuries. Specifically, these physical examination maneuvers examine the integrity of the supraspinatus muscle and tendon.

== Test procedures ==
In both tests, the patient is placed in a standing or sitting position, and the arms are raised parallel to the ground in the scapular plane. The tests differ in the rotation of the arm; in the empty can test, the arm is rotated to full internal rotation (thumb down) and in the full can test, the arm is rotated to 45° external rotation, thumb up. Once rotated, the clinician pushes down on either the wrists or the elbow, and the patient is instructed to resist the downward pressure.

== Test results ==
The test is considered positive if weakness, pain or both are present during resistance. A positive test result suggests a tear to the supraspinatus tendon or muscle, or neuropathy of the suprascapular nerve.

== Effectiveness ==
In Orthopedic Physical Assessment Atlas and Video (2011), Magee and Sueki provide the following data on the interrater reliability, specificity, and sensitivity data regarding the Empty can test.

Reliability/Specificity/Sensitivity
Reliability	k = 0.43
Specificity	62% - 89.5%
Sensitivity	25% - 88%
