= Acromion =

Bony process on the scapula (shoulder blade)

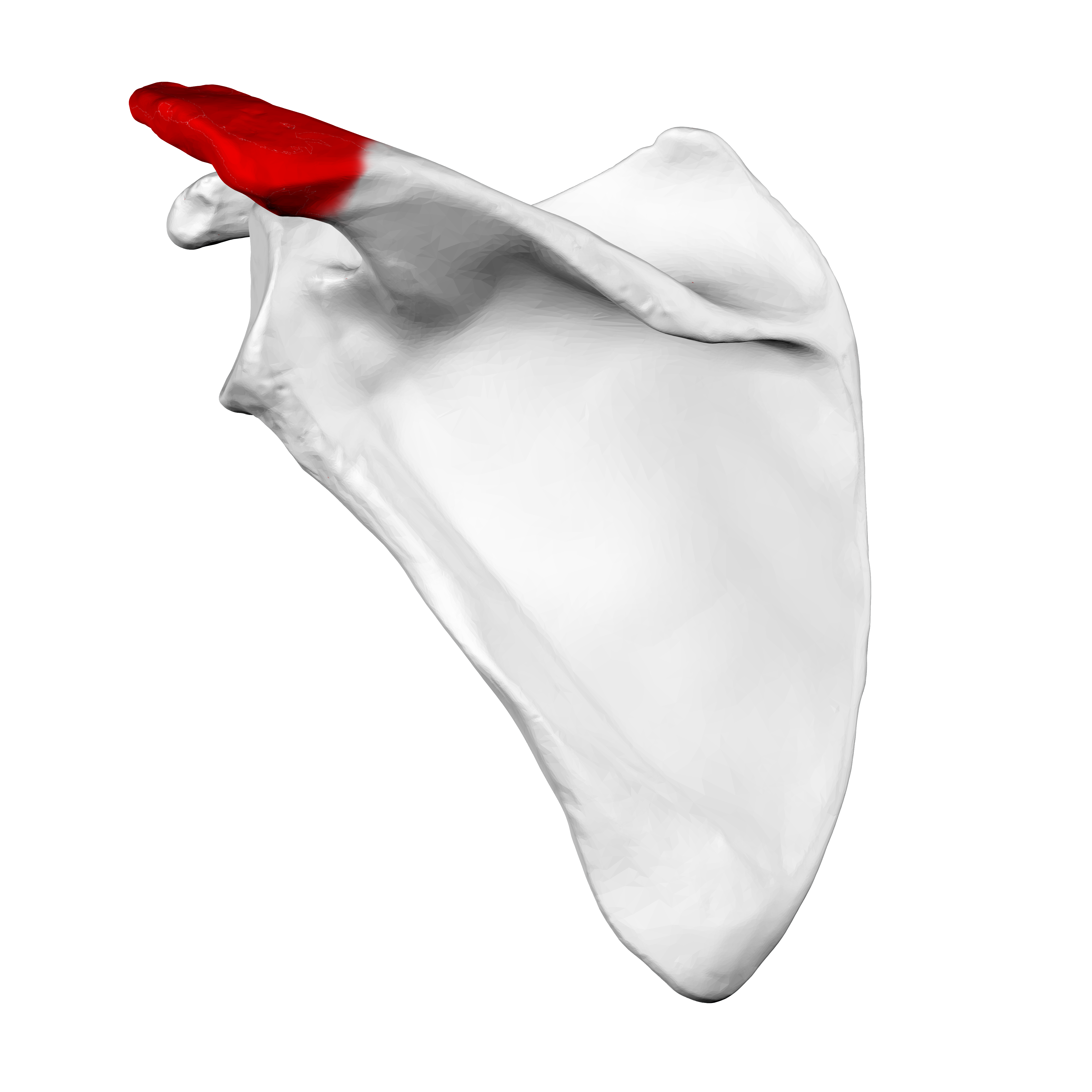
- Left scapula, posterior view. Acromion shown in red.

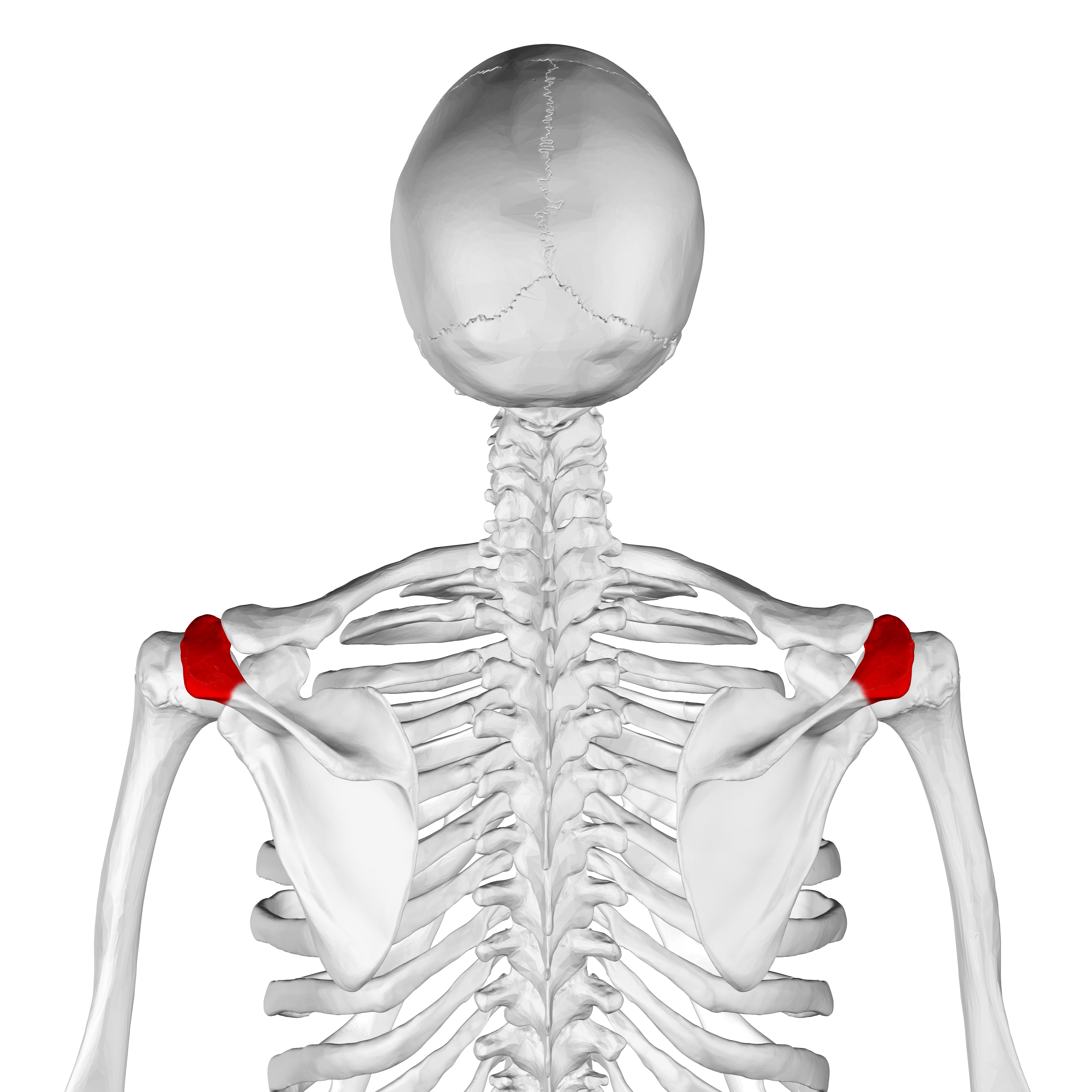
- Skeleton, posterior view. Acromion of each scapula shown in red.

Details

Identifiers
- Latin: acromion
- MeSH: D000174
- TA98: A02.4.01.009
- TA2: 1152
- FMA: 23260

In human anatomy, the acromion (from Greek: akros, "highest", ōmos, "shoulder", pl.: acromia) or summit of the shoulder is a bony process on the scapula (shoulder blade). Together with the coracoid process, it extends laterally over the shoulder joint. The acromion is a continuation of the scapular spine, and hooks over anteriorly. It articulates with the clavicle (collar bone) to form the acromioclavicular joint.

== Structure ==
The acromion forms the summit of the shoulder and is a large, somewhat triangular or oblong process, flattened from behind forward. It projects laterally at first, then curves forward and upward to overhang the glenoid fossa. It starts from the base of acromion which marks its projecting point emerging from the spine of scapula.

=== Surfaces ===
Its superior surface, directed upward, backward, and lateralward, is convex, rough, and gives attachment to some fibers of the deltoideus, and in the rest of its extent is subcutaneous. Its inferior surface is smooth and concave.

=== Borders ===
Its lateral border is thick and irregular, and presents three or four tubercles for the tendinous origins of the deltoid. Its medial border, shorter than the lateral, is concave, gives attachment to a portion of the trapezius, and presents about its center a small oval surface for articulation with the acromial end of the clavicle.

=== Variation ===
There are three morphologically distinct types of acromia and a correlation between these morphologies and rotator cuff tear:

Type	Appearance	Prevalence	Angle of anterior slope	Rotator cuff tear
Flat		17.1%	13.18	3.0%
Curved		42.9%	29.98	24.2%
Hooked		39.3%	26.98	69.8%

==== Os acromiale ====
The acromion has four ossification centers called (from tip to base) pre-acromion, meso-acromion, meta-acromion, and basi-acromion. In most cases, the first three fuse at 15–18 years, whereas the base part fuses to the scapular spine at 12 years. However, in between 1% and 15% of cases, this osseous union fails and the acromion remains separate as an accessory bone. This condition is referred to as os acromiale, but rarely causes pain. Earlier estimates of its prevalence were as low as 1.4%, and this higher estimate was made by Sammarco in the year 2000, based on radiographic and anatomical studies.

Four types of os acromiale can be distinguished:

- A non-union between the meso- and meta-acromia, the most common or typical os acromiale
- A non-union between the pre- and meso-acromia
- A non-union between the pre- and meso-acromia; and between the meso- and meta-acromia, atypical
- A non-union between the pre- and meso-acromia; between the pre- and meso-acromia; and between the meta- and basi-acromia

This feature was common in skeletons recovered from the Mary Rose shipwreck: it is thought that in those men, much archery practice from childhood on with the mediaeval war bow (which needs a pull three times as strong as the modern standard Olympic bow) pulled at the acromion so much that it prevented bony fusion of the acromion with the scapula.

Although historically regarded as an incidental finding, the os acromiale may occasionally produce symptoms from subacromial impingement or instability at the site of non-union. In people with symptoms of os acromiale, dynamic ultrasound sometimes shows hypermobility in the area during shoulder movement, or graded compression with the probe.

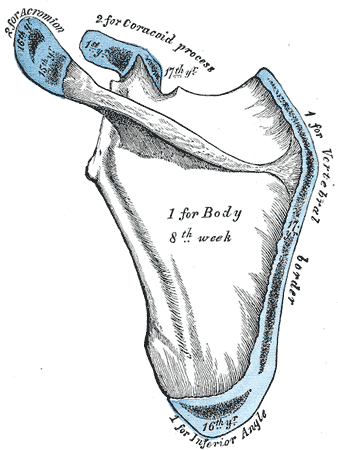
Plan of ossification of the scapula. Posterior side. Acromion visible at upper left, in blue.

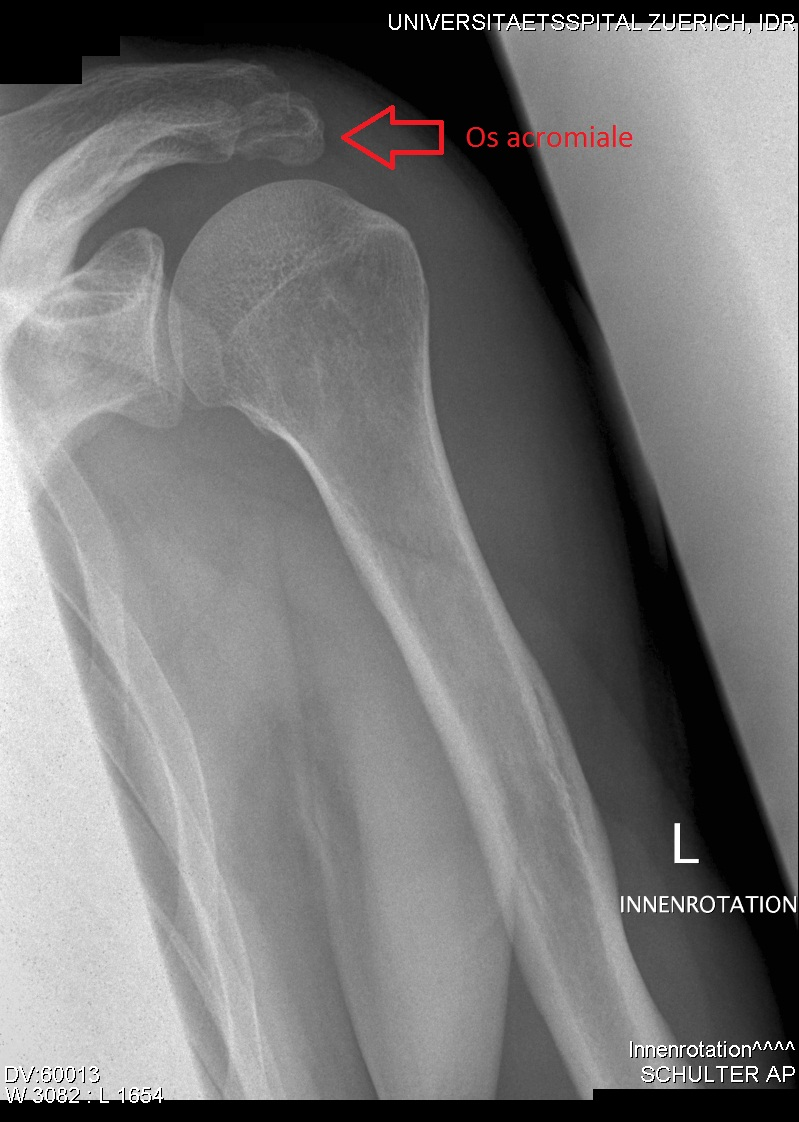
Radiograph of the shoulder showing an os acromiale

== Changes from age ==
Anterior acromial spur formation is an age-dependent process, with a significantly increased likelihood after the age of 50. However, variation in acromial morphological condition are not acquired from the age-related changes such as spur formation and thus contribute to impingement disease independently.

== In other animals ==
The acromion process of bats (Mammalia: Chiroptera) is particularly elongated compared to that of humans.

Turtles have an acromion that forms the anterior part of the triradiate pectoral girdle (together with the coracoid and scapula). In this highly specialized endoskeletal structure, the scapula is a dorsal (directed upwards) process attached to the first rib; the coracoid is a posteroventral (directed backward and down) process; and the acromion is a medioventral (directed inwards and down) process (also known as the prescapular process) located at the base of the scapula. This had led to some controversy regarding the evolutionary origin of turtles, because in both pareiasaurs and non-mammalian therapsids the acromion is located at the dorsal tip of the scapula.

In modern turtles, the acromion projects ventrally and articulates with the plastron (the flat lower part of the shell), but it evolved independently in pareiasaurs and turtles long before the plastron. In these primitive ancestors, the acromion projected forward to form a strong and flexible articulation between the shoulder girdle and the clavicle. Notwithstanding these changes, the acromion of turtles retains its original function, to support the shoulder girdle and increase stride length.

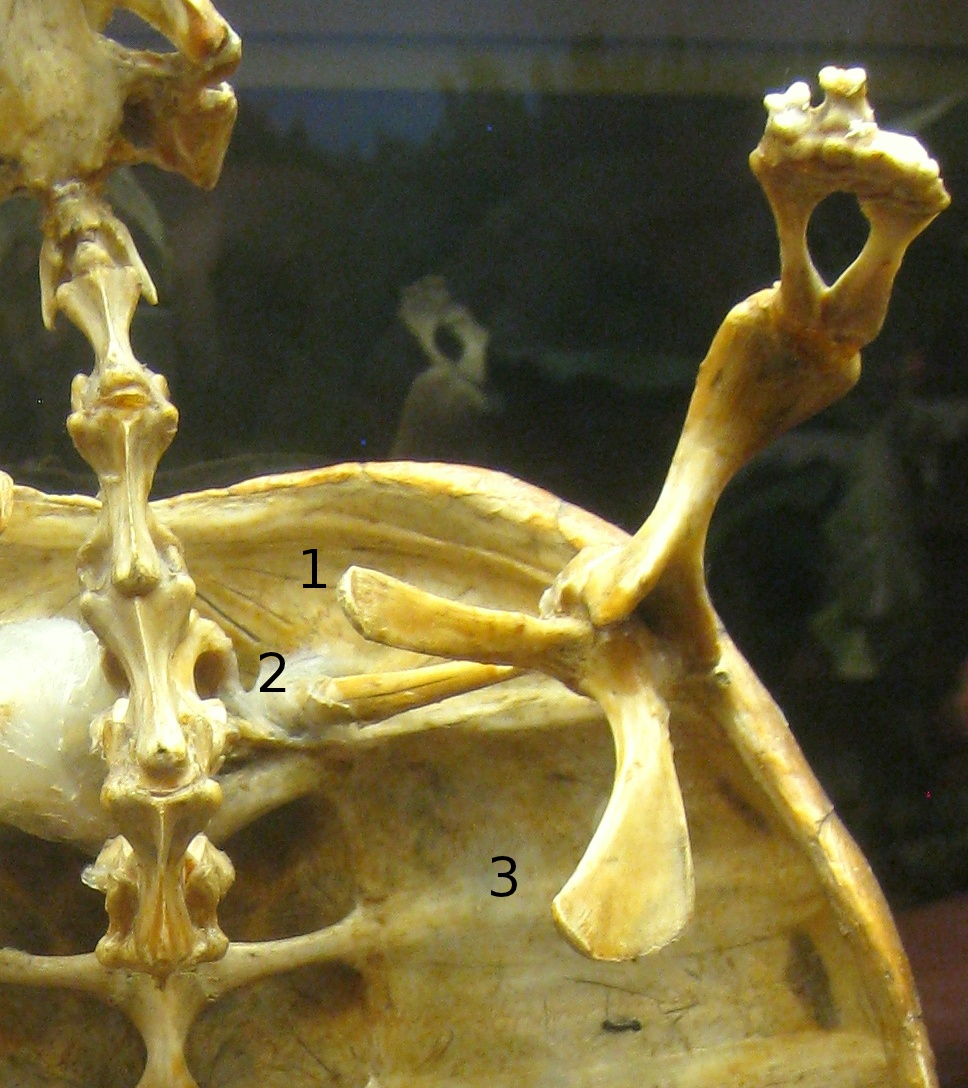
The shoulder girdle of a snapping turtle. (1) Acromion, (2) scapula, and (3) coracoid

== Additional images ==
Left scapula. Acromion shown in red.

Animation. Acromion shown in red.

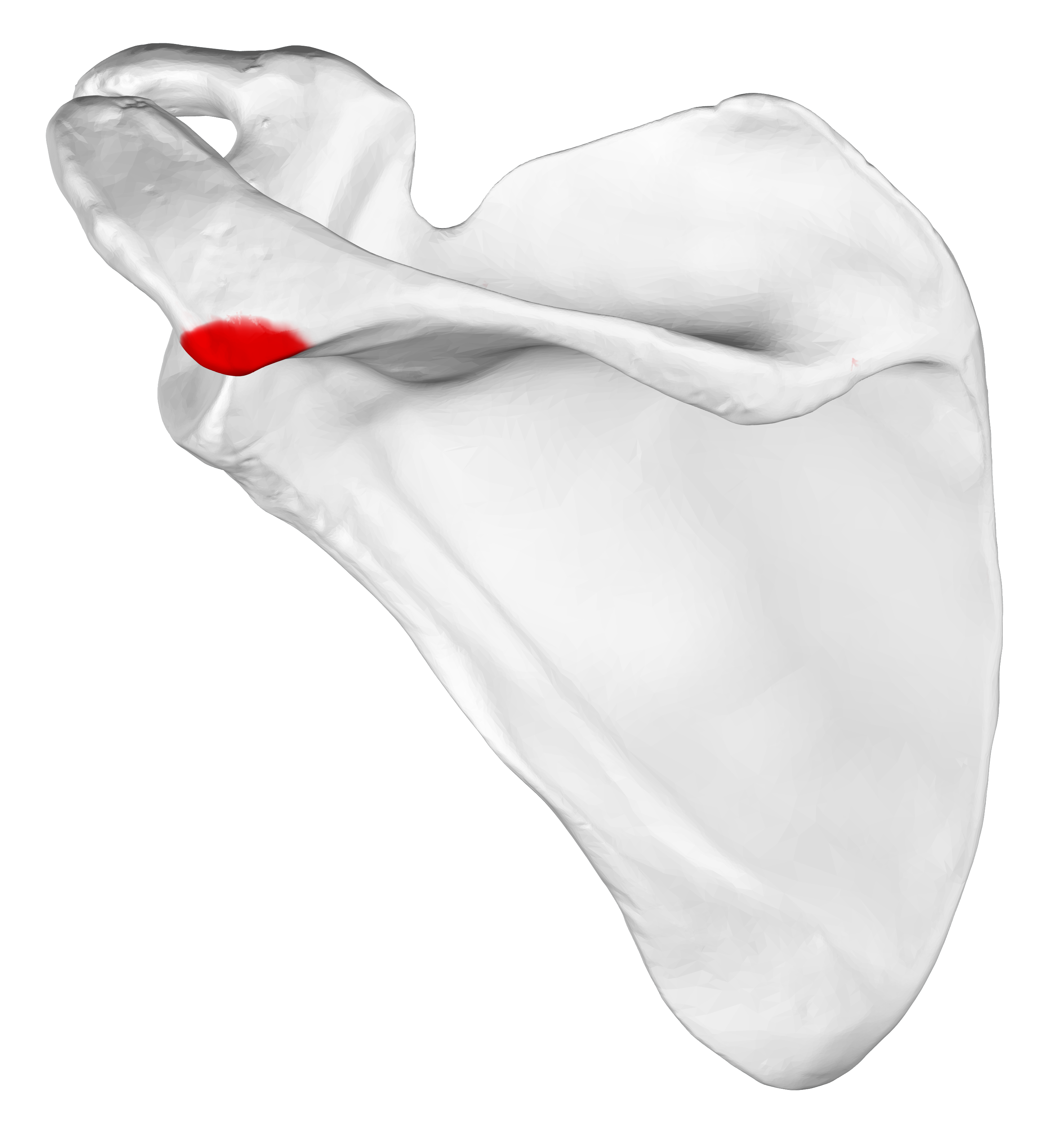
Acromial angle shown in red.

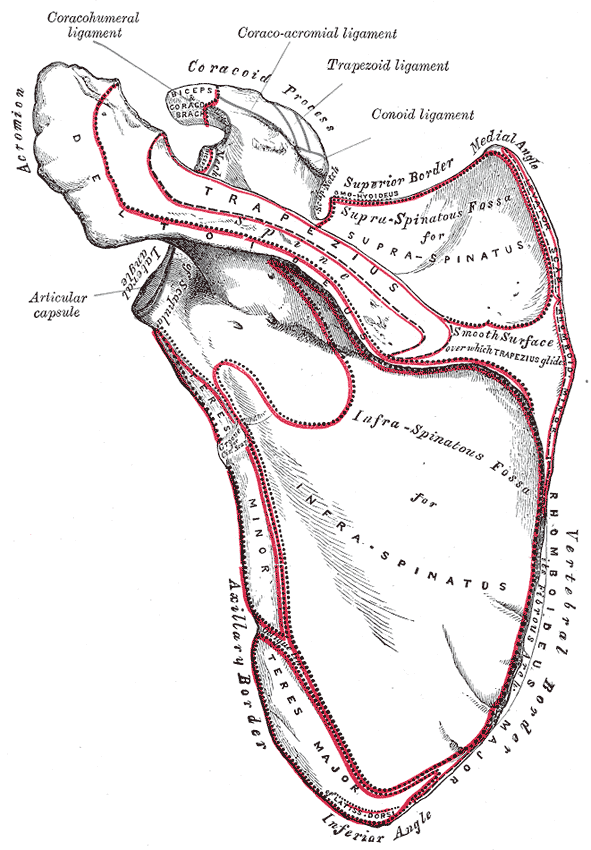
Left scapula. Posterior view. Acromion labeled at top left.

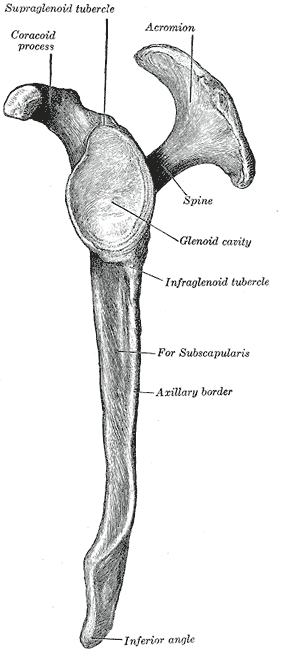
Left scapula. Lateral view.

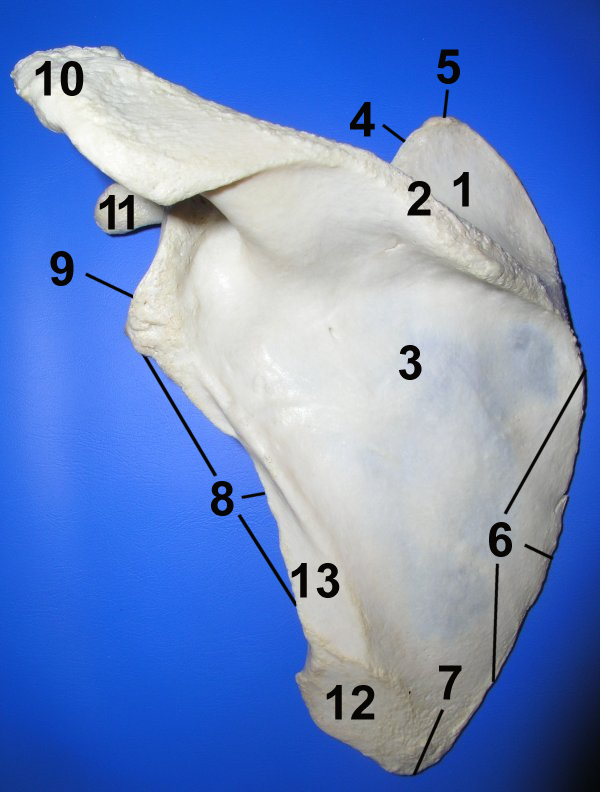
Left scapula. Posterior view. Acromion is "10"

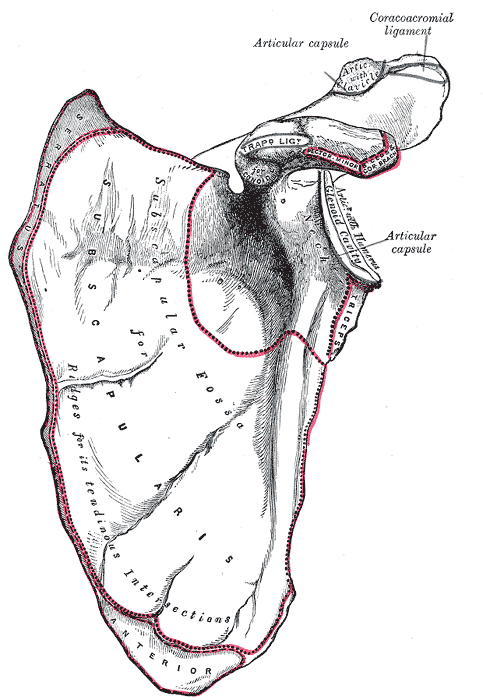
Left scapula. Anterior view. Acromion labeled at top right.

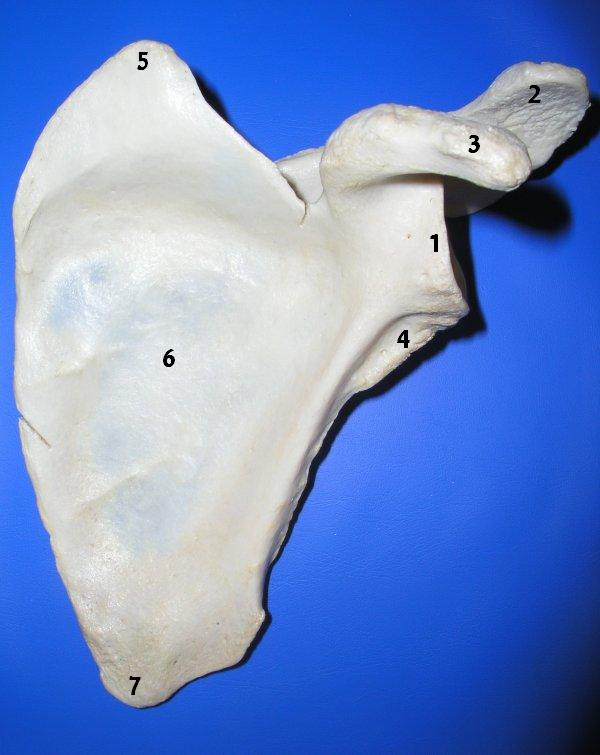
Left scapula. Anterior view. Acromion is "2"

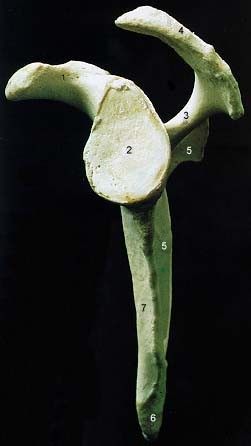
Left scapula. Lateral view. Acromion is "4"

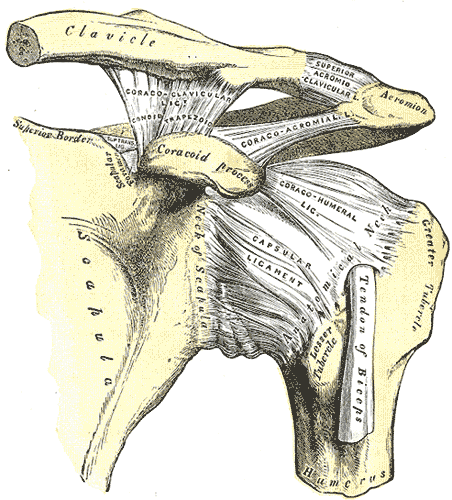
The left shoulder and acromioclavicular joints, and the proper ligaments of the scapula. Anterior view.

== Notes ==
- Habermeyer, Peter; Magosch, Petra; Lichtenberg, Sven (2006). Classifications and Scores of the Shoulder. Heidelberg: Springer. ISBN 978-3-540-24350-2.
- Lee, Michael S. Y. (January 22, 1996). "The Homologies and Early Evolution of the Shoulder Girdle in Turtles". Proc. R. Soc. Lond. B. 263 (1366): 111–117. doi:10.1098/rspb.1996.0018. S2CID 84529868.
- Rieppel, Olivier; Reisz, Robert R. (1999). "The Origin and Early Evolution of Turtles". Annual Review of Ecology and Systematics. 30 (1): 1–22. Bibcode:1999AnRES..30....1R. doi:10.1146/annurev.ecolsys.30.1.1. Archived from the original (PDF) on 2018-12-26.
- Warner, Jon J.P.; Beim, Gloria M.; Higgins, Laurence (September 1998). "The Treatment of Symptomatic Os Acromiale". The Journal of Bone and Joint Surgery. 80 (9): 1320–6. doi:10.2106/00004623-199809000-00011. PMID 9759817.
