= Scapulohumeral muscles =

Seven muscles connecting the humerus to the scapula

The scapulohumeral muscles are a group of seven muscles that connect the humerus to the scapula. They are amongst the muscles that act on and stabilise the glenohumeral joint in the human body.

They include :

- coracobrachialis muscle
- deltoid muscle
- rotator cuff muscles :

- infraspinatus muscle
- subscapularis muscle
- supraspinatus muscle
- teres minor muscle

- teres major muscle

== See also ==
Other muscles that attach to the humerus and affect its rotation and stability :

- latissimus dorsi muscle
- pectoralis major muscle
