= Parsonage–Turner syndrome =

Inflammation of the brachial plexus nerves of the arm

- Other names: acute brachial radiculitis, Parsonage–Aldren–Turner syndrome', neuralgic amyotrophy, brachial neuritis, brachial plexus neuropathy, brachial plexitis, acute brachial neuropathy
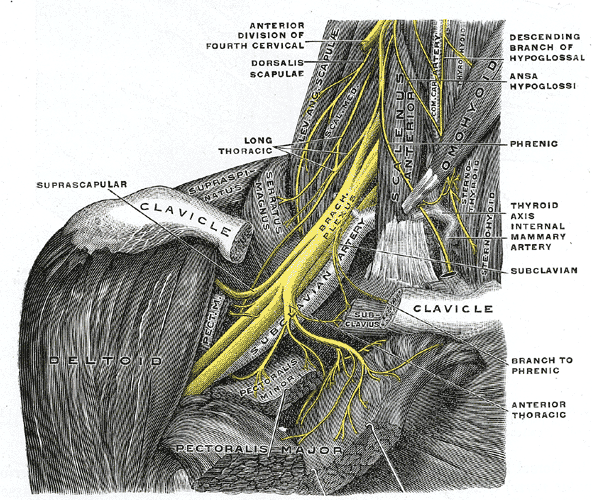
- The right brachial plexus with its short branches, viewed from in front.
- Specialty: Neurology
- Named after: Maurice Parsonage; John Turner

Parsonage–Turner syndrome (abbreviated PTS), also known as acute brachial neuropathy and neuralgic amyotrophy, is a syndrome of unknown cause; although many specific risk factors have been identified (such as; post-operative, post-infectious, post-traumatic or post-vaccination). It is also known as brachial plexitis, and results in brachial plexus inflammation without any apparent shoulder injury. PTS can manifest with severe pain in the shoulder or arm, followed by numbness and weakness.

Parsonage–Turner syndrome occurs in about 1.6 out of 100,000 people every year.

== Signs and symptoms ==
This syndrome can begin with severe shoulder or arm pain followed by weakness and numbness. Those with Parsonage–Turner experience acute, sudden-onset pain radiating from the shoulder to the upper arm. Affected muscles become weak and atrophied, and in advanced cases, paralyzed. Occasionally, there will be no pain and just paralysis, and sometimes just pain, not ending in paralysis. MRI may assist in diagnosis. Scapular winging is commonly seen.

== Mechanism ==
Parsonage-Turner involves neuropathy of the suprascapular nerve in 97% of cases, and variably involves the axillary and subscapular nerves. As such, the muscles usually involved are the supraspinatus and infraspinatus, which are both innervated by the suprascapular nerve. Involvement of the deltoid is more variable, as it is innervated by the axillary nerve.

== Diagnosis ==
Diagnosis often takes three to nine months to be made, as the condition is often unrecognised by physicians.

=== Differential diagnosis ===
The differential focuses on distinguishing it from similar entities such as quadrilateral space syndrome, which involves the teres minor and variably the deltoid, and suprascapular nerve impingement at the spinoglenoid notch, which predominantly involves the infraspinatus.

== Prognosis ==
Despite its wasting and at times long-lasting effects, most cases are resolved by the body's healing system, and recovery is usually good in 18–24 months, depending on how old the person in question is. For instance, a six-year-old could have brachial neuritis for only around six months, but a person in their early 50s could have it for more than three years.

It was traditionally thought that most people would regain around 70 to 90 percent of their original strength and function levels, however most recent studies suggest that long-term complications are more common than previously thought.

== Association with COVID-19 infection and vaccination ==
Parsonage-Turner syndrome has been reported in several cases following SARS-CoV-2 infection and COVID-19 vaccination. Systemic reviews of published case reports and case series report individuals who have developed PTS after either the COVID-19 vaccination or infection. Similar to the typical presentation of PTS, symptoms generally present days to weeks after exposure.

The clinical features described in these reports mirror many of the standard presentations of PTS, including the sudden onset of shoulder or upper limb pain followed by weakness and sensory changes affecting the brachial plexus. With the cases of PTS reported after post-vaccination, the syndrome has been most associated with mRNA vaccines such as Pfizer-BioNTech and Moderna. However, cases have been also reported with viral vector vaccines as well.

While a temporal relationship between COVID-19 infection or vaccination and PTS has been observed, a direct causal relationship cannot be established at this time. PTS has been long associated with triggers such as infections and vaccinations. Therefore, cases of linking COVID-19 and PTS may reflect this association rather than a specific effect of the SARS-CoV-2 virus or the vaccine itself.

== Eponym ==
It is named after British neurologists Maurice Parsonage and John Turner, who described 136 cases in a 1948 Lancet publication. Other cases with similar symptom presentation had previously been published as early as 1897, but these publications were not as extensive as Parsonage and Turner's 1948 publication.

== See also ==
- Hereditary neuralgic amyotrophy
