= Axillary space =

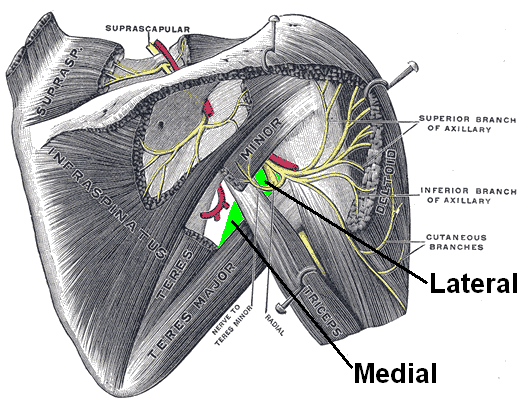
- Axillary Spaces

Details
- Function: Anatomic space through which contents leave the axilla.

Identifiers
- Latin: spatium axillare

The axillary spaces are anatomic spaces. through which axillary contents leave the axilla. They consist of the quadrangular space, triangular space, and triangular interval. It is bounded by teres major, teres minor, medial border of the humerus, and long head of triceps brachii.

They should not be confused with the true "axillary space" within the borders of the axilla.

== Structure ==
=== Axilla ===
The true axilla is a conical space with its apex at the Cervico-axillary Canal, Base at the axillary fascia and skin of the armpit. When viewed in an axillary plane (axillary cut), it is more triangle with: Medial Wall: Serratus Anterior, Anterior Wall: pectoral muscles, Posterior Wall: subscapularis muscle, where the "apex" of the triangle is the humerus

=== Quadrangular space ===
This space is in the posterior wall of the axilla. It is a quadrangular space bounded laterally by surgical neck of the humerus, medially by long head of triceps brachii and inferiorly by teres major. It is bounded superiorly by subscapularis in front, capsule of the shoulder joint in the middle, and behind by teres minor. The axillary nerve and posterior humeral circumflex artery and vein pass through this space.

=== Triangular space ===
This space (sin. medial triangular space) is also in the posterior wall of the axilla. It is a triangular space bounded medially by teres minor, laterally by long head of triceps brachii, and inferiorly by teres major. The scapular circumflex artery and scapular circumflex vein pass through this space.

=== Triangular interval ===
This space (a.k.a. lateral triangular space) is in the inferior to the posterior wall of the axilla. The triangular interval is bounded medially by long head of triceps brachii, laterally by medial border of humerus (some say the lateral head of the triceps), and superiorly by teres major. The radial nerve and profunda brachii artery and vein passes through this space.
