= Quadrilateral space syndrome =

- Other names: Quadrangular space syndrome
- Shoulder muscle (rotator cuff)
- Specialty: Neurology

Quadrilateral space syndrome is a rotator cuff denervation syndrome in which the axillary nerve is compressed at the quadrilateral space of the rotator cuff.

== Diagnosis ==
Diagnosis is usually suspected by clinical history and confirmed by MRI, in which edema of the teres minor is seen, with variable involvement of the deltoid. The circumflex humeral artery may also be compressed. Before the advent of MRI, compression of this vessel on angiography used to be the mechanism of diagnosis, although this is no longer done as it is an invasive procedure.

Atrophy can occur in cases of chronic nerve impingement. It can be associated with a glenoid labral cyst, with the cyst also reflecting injury of the glenoid labrum.

=== Differential diagnosis ===
Differential considerations include similar rotator cuff denervation syndromes such as Parsonage–Turner syndrome, and compression of the suprascapular nerve at the spinoglenoid notch in which the infraspinatus, and to a lesser degree supraspinatus is involved.

== Treatment ==
Treatment is decompression of the quadrilateral space, with supportive therapy in recalcitrant cases.

== See also ==
- Parsonage–Turner syndrome
- Rotator cuff
- Sports medicine
- Radiology
