= Posterior humeral circumflex vessels =

Blood vessels

The posterior humeral circumflex vessels or posterior circumflex humeral vessels are the posterior humeral circumflex artery and the posterior humeral circumflex vein which run through the quadrangular (or quadrilateral) space with the axillary nerve.
