= Axillary nerve dysfunction =

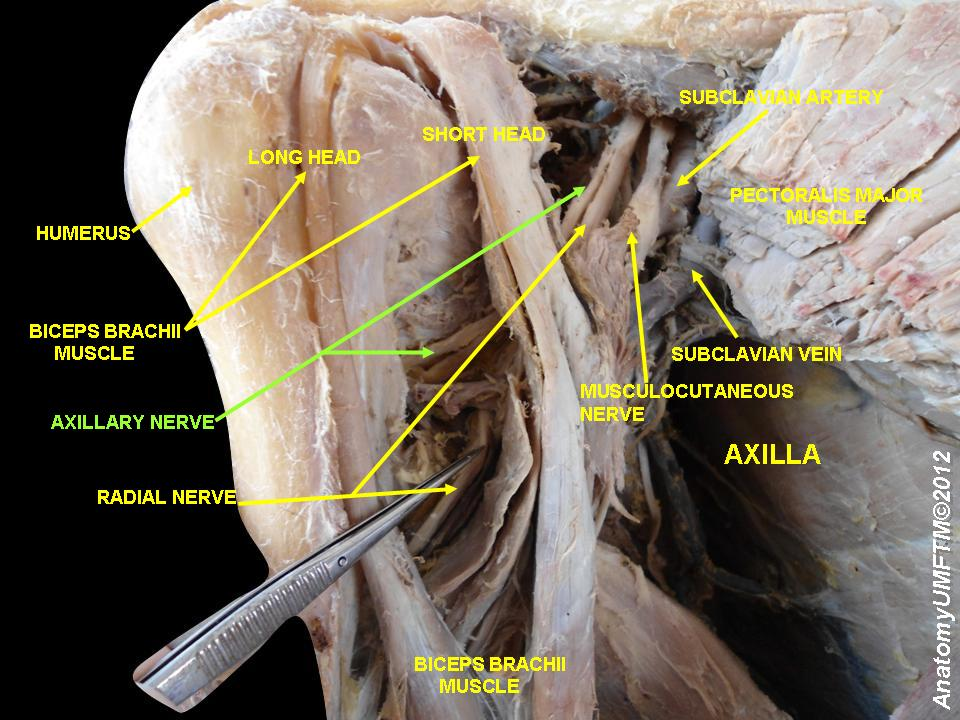
- Axillary nerve(green arrow)
- Specialty: Neurology

Axillary nerve dysfunction is any disorder caused by damage to the axillary nerve. The axillary nerve is a branch of the brachial plexus that innervates the deltoid and teres minor muscles. This nerve can be injured or damaged in a variety of ways - penetrating injury such as knife or gunshot wounds, surgical trauma, stretch injury (common after motor cycle accidents), and various metabolic or rheumatic conditions that may cause focal disruption of the blood supply to the nerve. Axillary nerve dysfunction is often medically investigated with electromyography, which can help localize the lesion to a particular portion of the nerve
