= Triangular space =

Anatomical region of the shoulder joint

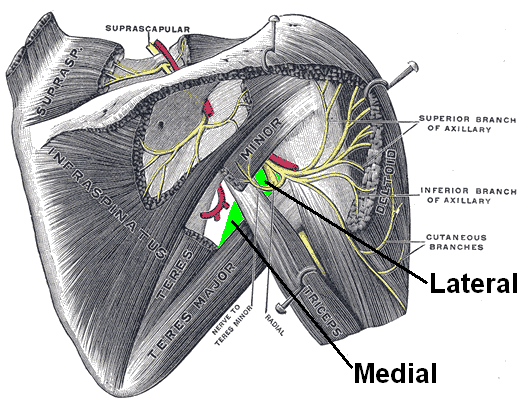
- Suprascapular and axillary nerves of right side, seen from behind. The axillary spaces are labeled in green. Triangular space is the medial space.

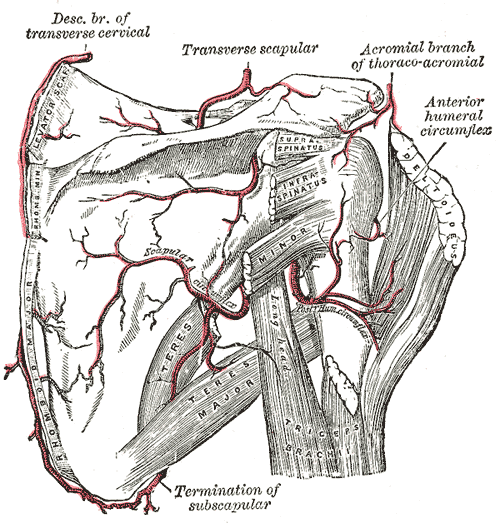
- The scapular and circumflex arteries. (Triangular space is visible but not labeled.)

The triangular space (also known as the medial triangular space, upper triangular space, medial axillary space or foramen omotricipitale) is one of the three spaces found at the axillary space. The other two spaces are the quadrangular space and the triangular interval.

== Boundaries ==
It has the following boundaries:

- Inferior: the superior border of the teres major;
- Lateral: the long head of the triceps;
- Superior: Teres minor

For the superior border, some sources list the teres minor, while others list the subscapularis.

== Contents ==
It contains the scapular circumflex vessels.

Unlike the quadrangular space or the triangular interval, no major nerve passes through the triangular space.

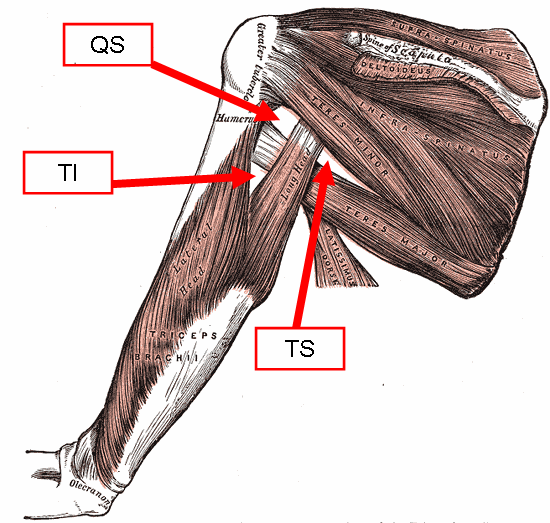
Muscles on the dorsum of the scapula, and the triceps brachii.

== See also ==
- Quadrangular space
- Triangular interval
