= Hereditary neuralgic amyotrophy =

- This condition is inherited in an autosomal dominant manner
- Specialty: Neurology

Hereditary neuralgic amyotrophy (HNA) is a neuralgic disorder that is characterized by nerve damage and muscle atrophy, preceded by severe pain. In about half of the cases it is associated with a mutation of the SEPT9 gene (17q25). While not much is known about this disorder, it has been characterized to be similar to Parsonage-Turner syndrome in prognosis.

== Symptoms and signs ==
Symptoms of HNA may include pain in the back, neck, arms, or shoulders, nerve pulls in the arms or back, muscular atrophy, and weakness.

=== Presentation ===
HNA is an episodic disorder; it is characterized by episodes generally lasting 1–6 weeks. During an episode, the nerves of the brachial plexus are targeted by the body as antigens, and the body's immune system begins to damage the nerves of the brachial plexus. The exact order or location of the nerve degeneration cannot be predicted before an episode. Other areas of the nervous system that have been affected are the phrenic nerves and the recurrent laryngeal nerve. As the nerves lose function, the muscles associated with those nerves begin to atrophy. In brachial plexus degeneration, atrophy may occur in the deltoid muscles. In phrenic nerve degeneration, the diaphragm may be affected. In this case, breathing can be impaired due to a lack of muscle control of the diaphragm. If the recurrent larangyl nerve is targeted, the pharynx will begin to atrophy and voice function may be lost.

== Diagnosis ==
Diagnosis may be made through thorough patient history, neurological evaluation and EMG/MRI/Muscle biopsy to rule out other causes of neuralgia.

== Treatment ==
The severe pain of HNA can be controlled with an anti-inflammatory drug such as prednisone, although it is unknown whether these anti-inflammatory drugs actually slow or stop the nerve degeneration process.

Nerve regeneration after an episode is normal, and in less severe cases a full recovery of the nerves and muscles can be expected. However, in a severe case permanent nerve damage and muscle loss may occur.

== See also ==
- Parsonage Turner Syndrome, known as Neuralgic Amyotrophy
