= Triangular interval =

Intermuscular space in the shoulder

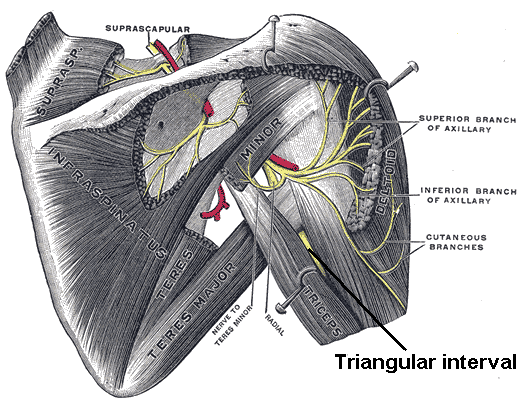
- Suprascapular and axillary nerves of right side, seen from behind. Triangular interval is labeled.)

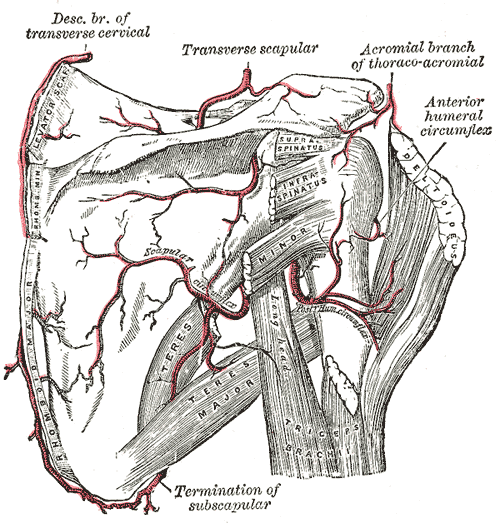
- The scapular and circumflex arteries. (Triangular interval is visible but not labeled.)

The triangular interval (also known as the lateral triangular space, lower triangular space, and triceps hiatus) is a space found in the axilla. It is one of the three intermuscular spaces found in the axillary space. The other two spaces are: quadrangular space and triangular space.

== Borders ==
Two of its borders are as follows:

- teres major - superior
- long head of the triceps brachii - medial

Some sources state the lateral border is the humerus, while others define it as the lateral head of the triceps. (The effective difference is relatively minor, though.)

== Contents ==
The contents of its borders are as follows:

- Radial nerve
- Profunda brachii

The radial nerve is visible through the triangular interval, on its way to the posterior compartment of the arm. Profunda brachii also passes through the triangular interval from anterior to posterior.

== Additional images ==
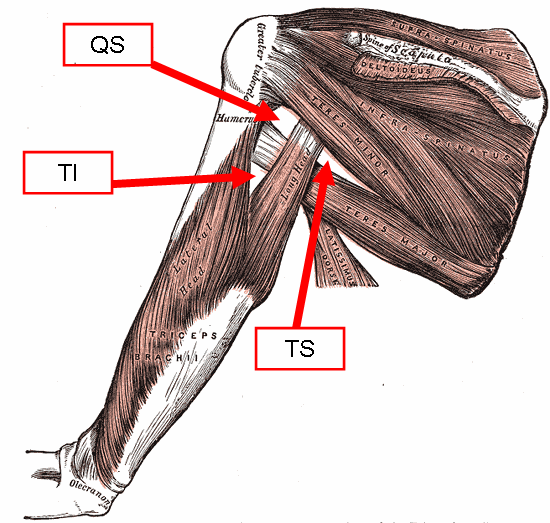
Muscles on the dorsum of the scapula, and the triceps brachii.

== Triangular Interval Syndrome ==
Triangular Interval Syndrome (TIS) was described as a differential diagnosis for radicular pain in the upper extremity. It is a condition where the radial nerve is entrapped in the triangular interval resulting in upper extremity radicular pain. The radial nerve and profunda brachii pass through the triangular interval and are hence vulnerable. The triangular interval has a potential for compromise secondary alterations in thickness of the teres major and triceps. It is described based on cadaveric studies that fibrous bands were commonly present between the teres major and triceps. When these bands were present, rotation of the shoulder caused a reduction in cross sectional area of the space. Normal resting postures of humeral adduction and internal rotation with scapular protraction may be speculated as a precedent for teres major contractures owing to the shortened position of this muscle in this position. In addition, hypertrophy of this muscle can occur secondary to weight training and potentially compromise the triangular interval with resultant entrapment of the radial nerve. Shoulder dysfunctions have a potential for shortening and hypertrophy of the teres major. Shoulders that exhibit stiffness, secondary to capsular tightness, contribute to contracture and hypertrophy of the teres major. Hence, restricted external rotation can encourage adaptive shortening and thickening of the internal rotators of the shoulder principally the teres major and subscapularis. One may speculate that the lateral arm pain presented in shoulder dysfunctions may be of a nerve origin secondary to adverse neural tension of the radial nerve. The triceps brachii has a potential to entrap the radial nerve in the triangular interval secondary to hypertrophy. The presence of a fibrous arch in the long head and lateral head further complicates the situation. Repeated forceful extension seen in weight training and sport involving punching may be a precedent to this scenario. The radial nerve is vulnerable as it passes through this space, for all of the reasons mentioned above.

== See also ==
- Axillary spaces
- Quadrangular space
- Triangular space
