= Injury of axillary nerve =

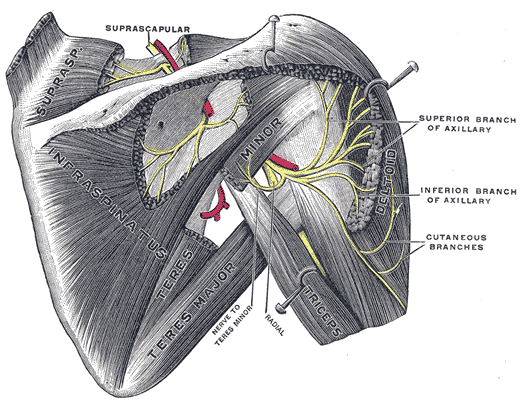
- Suprascapular and axillary nerves of right side, seen from behind.
- Specialty: Neurology

Injury of axillary nerve (axillary neuropathy) is a condition that can be associated with a surgical neck of the humerus fracture.

It can also be associated with a dislocated shoulder or with traction injury to the nerve, which may be caused by over-aggressive stretching or blunt trauma that does not result in fracture or dislocation. One form of this injury is referred to as axillary nerve palsy.

Injury most commonly occurs proximal to the quadrangular space.

Injury in this nerve causes paralysis (as always) to the muscles innervated by it, most importantly deltoid muscle. This muscle is the main abductor of the shoulder joint from 18 to 90 degrees (from 0 to 18 by supraspinatus). Injury can result in a reduction in shoulder abduction. So a test can be applied to a patient with injury of axillary nerve by trying to abduct the injured shoulder against resistance.

The pain from axillary neuropathy is usually dull and aching rather than sharp, and increases with increasing range of motion. Many people notice only mild pain but considerable weakness when they try to use the affected shoulder.
