= Shoulder joint =

Synovial ball and socket joint in the shoulder

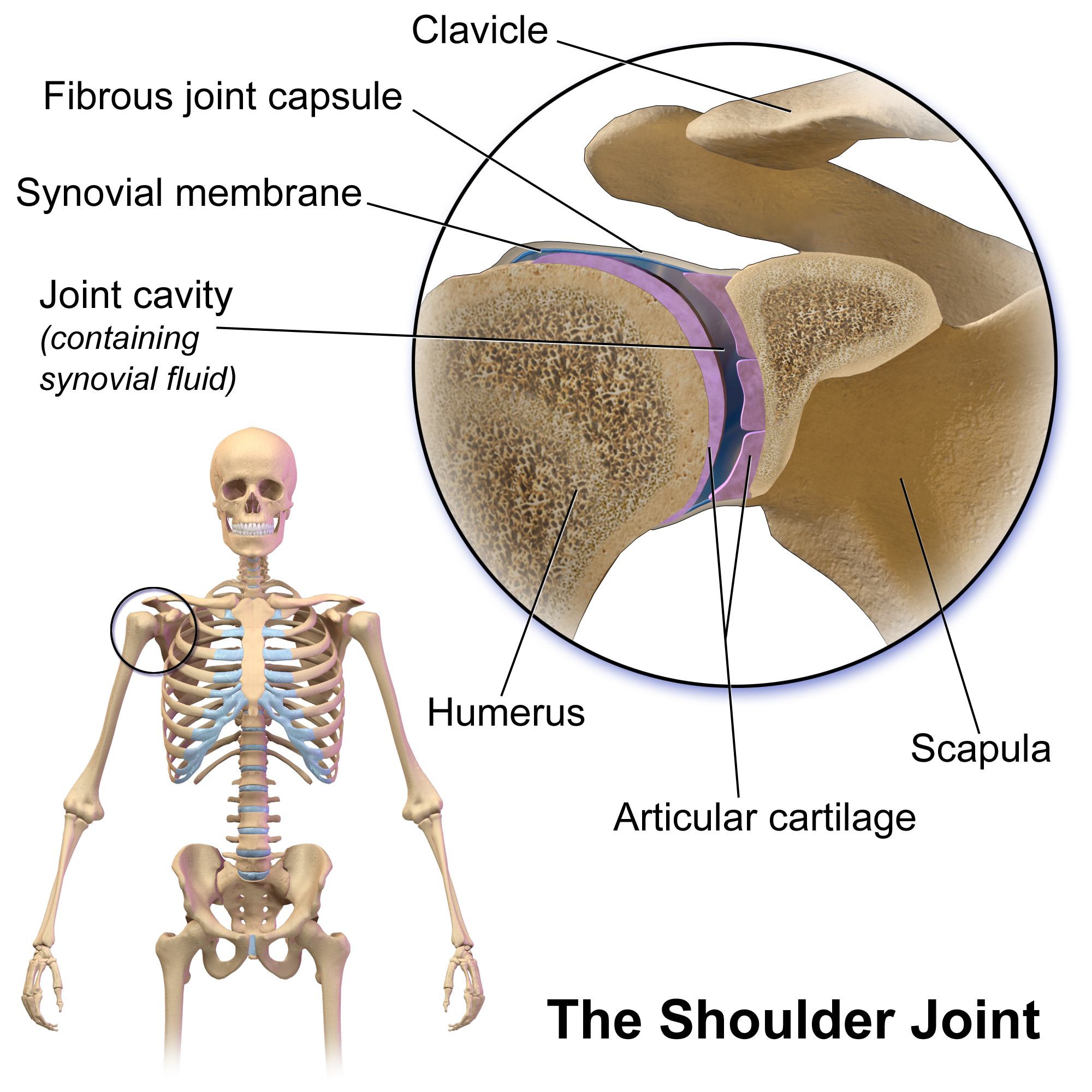
- Cross-section of shoulder joint

Details

Identifiers
- Latin: articulatio humeri
- MeSH: D012785
- TA98: A03.5.08.001
- TA2: 1764
- FMA: 25912

The shoulder joint (or glenohumeral joint from Greek glene, eyeball, + -oid, 'form of', + Latin humerus, shoulder) is structurally classified as a synovial ball-and-socket joint and functionally as a diarthrosis and multiaxial joint. It involves an articulation between the glenoid fossa of the scapula (shoulder blade) and the head of the humerus (upper arm bone). Due to the very loose joint capsule, it gives a limited interface of the humerus and scapula and is the most mobile joint of the human body. Comparatively, the shoulder joint differs in other species, providing different movements, locations, etc, in comparison to humans.

== Structure ==
The shoulder joint is a ball-and-socket joint between the scapula and the humerus. The socket of the glenoid fossa of the scapula is itself quite shallow, but it is made deeper by the addition of the glenoid labrum. The glenoid labrum is a ring of cartilaginous fibre attached to the circumference of the cavity. This ring is continuous with the tendon of the biceps brachii above.

=== Spaces ===
Significant joint spaces are:

- The normal glenohumeral space is 4–5 mm.

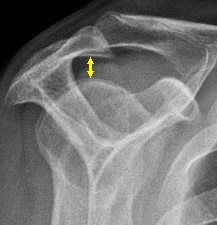
Supraspinatus outlet view X-ray, showing subacromial space measurement

- The normal subacromial space in shoulder radiographs is 9–10 mm; this space is significantly greater in men, with a slight reduction with age. In middle age, a subacromial space less than 6 mm is pathological, and may indicate a rupture of the tendon of the supraspinatus muscle.

The axillary space is an anatomic space between the associated muscles of the shoulder. This space transmits the subscapular artery and the axillary nerve.

=== Capsule ===
The shoulder joint has a very loose joint capsule, which can sometimes predispose the shoulder to dislocate.

The "U shaped" dependent portion of the axillary part of the capsule, located between the anterior and posterior bands of inferior glenohumeral ligament, is called "axillary pouch".

Synovium extends below the long head of biceps and subscapularis tendon to form subscapular bursa. Therefore, long head of biceps is extrasynovial and intracapsular, attaching to supraglenoid tubercle.

=== Bursae ===
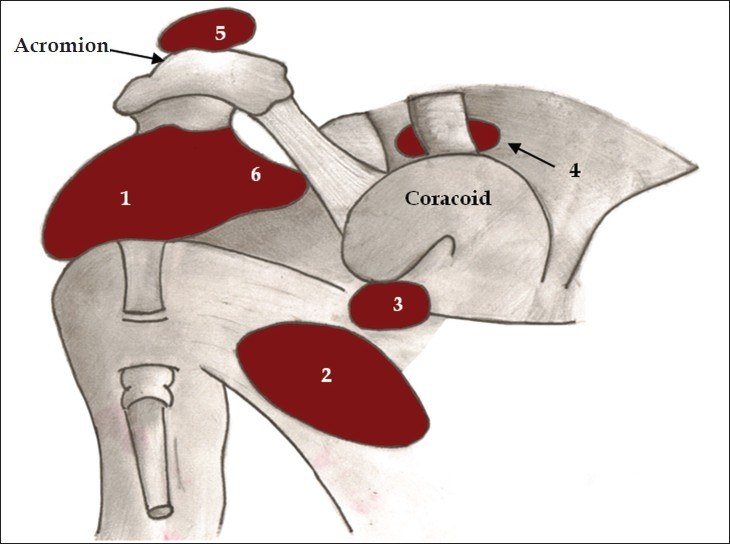
Bursae of shoulder joint: (1) and (6) subacromial-subdeltoid bursa, (2) subscapular recess, (3) subcoracoid bursa, (4) coracoclavicular bursa, (5) supra-acromial bursa

A number of small fluid-filled sacs known as synovial bursae are located around the capsule to aid mobility:

- Between the joint capsule and the deltoid muscle is the subacromial-subdeltoid bursa.
- Between the capsule and the acromion is the subacromial bursa.
- The subcoracoid bursa is between the capsule and the coracoid process of the scapula.
- The coracobrachial bursa is between the subscapularis muscle and the tendon of the coracobrachialis muscle.
- Between the capsule and the tendon of the subscapularis muscle is the subscapular bursa, this is also known as the subtendinous bursa of the scapularis.

The supra-acromial bursa does not normally communicate with the shoulder joint.

=== Muscles ===
The shoulder joint is muscle-dependent, as it lacks strong ligaments. The primary stabilizers of the shoulder include the biceps brachii on the anterior side of the arm and tendons of the rotator cuff, which are fused to all sides of the capsule except the inferior margin.

The tendon of the long head of the biceps brachii passes through the bicipital groove on the humerus and inserts on the superior margin of the glenoid cavity to press the head of the humerus against the glenoid cavity. Other long muscles such as pectoralis major, latissimus dorsi, teres major and deltoid muscles also provide support to the shoulder joint.

The tendons of the rotator cuff and their respective muscles (supraspinatus muscle, infraspinatus, teres minor, and subscapularis) stabilize and fix the joint. The supraspinatus, infraspinatus and teres minor muscles aid in abduction and external rotation.

=== Ligaments ===
- Superior, middle and inferior glenohumeral ligaments. It is the thickenings of the capsule that passes from the upper part of glenoid to lesser tuberosity and inferior part of the head of humerus. These ligaments are weak unlike its posterior part which is supported by the infraspinatus muscle.
- Coracohumeral ligament
- Transverse humeral ligament
- Coraco-acromial ligament

=== Innervation ===
The nerves supplying the shoulder joint all arise in the brachial plexus. They are the suprascapular nerve, the axillary nerve and the lateral pectoral nerve.

Anatomical illustration of the brachial plexus with areas of roots, trunks, divisions and cords marked. Clicking on names of branches will link to their Wikipedia entry.

=== Blood supply ===
The shoulder joint is supplied with blood by branches of the anterior and posterior circumflex humeral arteries, the suprascapular artery and the scapular circumflex artery.

== Function ==
Animation of shoulder joint showing the supraspinatus muscle

The rotator cuff muscles of the shoulder produce a high tensile force, and help to pull the head of the humerus into the glenoid cavity.

The glenoid cavity is shallow and contains the glenoid labrum which deepens it and aids stability. With 120 degrees of unassisted flexion, the shoulder joint is the most mobile joint in the body.

Animation of the shoulder joint. The muscles shown are subscapularis muscle (at right), infraspinatus muscle (at top left), teres minor muscle (at bottom left)

The movement of the scapula across the rib cage in relation to the humerus is known as the scapulohumeral rhythm, and this helps to achieve a further range of movement. This range can be compromised by anything that changes the position of the scapula. This could be an imbalance in parts of the large trapezius muscles that hold the scapula in place. Such an imbalance could cause a forward head carriage which in turn can affect the range of movements of the shoulder.

=== Movements ===
- Flexion and extension of the shoulder joint in the (sagittal plane).
  - Flexion is carried out by the anterior fibres of the deltoid, pectoralis major and the coracobrachialis.
  - Extension is carried out by the latissimus dorsi and posterior fibres of the deltoid.
- Abduction and adduction of the shoulder (frontal plane).
  - Abduction is carried out by the deltoid and the supraspinatus in the first 90 degrees. From 90-180 degrees it is the trapezius and the serratus anterior.
  - Adduction is carried out by the pectoralis major, latissimus dorsi, teres major and the subscapularis.
- Horizontal abduction and horizontal adduction of the shoulder (transverse plane)
- Medial and lateral rotation of the shoulder (also known as internal and external rotation).
  - Medial rotation is carried out by the anterior fibres of the deltoid, teres major, subscapularis, pectoralis major and the latissimus dorsi.
  - Lateral rotation is carried out by the posterior fibres of the deltoid, infraspinatus and the teres minor.
- Circumduction of the shoulder (a combination of flexion/extension and abduction/adduction).

== Clinical significance ==
The capsule can become inflamed and stiff, with abnormal bands of tissue (adhesions) growing between the joint surfaces, causing pain and restricting the movement of the shoulder, a condition known as frozen shoulder or adhesive capsulitis.

A SLAP tear (superior labrum anterior to posterior) is a rupture in the glenoid labrum. SLAP tears are characterized by shoulder pain in specific positions, pain associated with overhead activities such as tennis or overhand throwing sports, and weakness of the shoulder. This type of injury often requires surgical repair.

Anterior dislocation of the glenohumeral joint occurs when the humeral head is displaced in the anterior direction. Anterior shoulder dislocation often is a result of a blow to the shoulder while the arm is in an abducted position. In younger people, these dislocation events are most commonly associated with fractures on the humerus and/or glenoid and can lead to recurrent instability. In older people, recurrent instability is rare but people often suffer rotator cuff tears. It is not uncommon for the arteries and nerves (axillary nerve) in the axillary region to be damaged as a result of a shoulder dislocation; which if left untreated can result in weakness, muscle atrophy, or paralysis.

Subacromial bursitis is a painful condition caused by inflammation which often presents a set of symptoms known as subacromial impingement.

Arthrography of shoulder joint (with or without computed tomography) is performed by injecting contrast below and lateral to the coracoid process to outline the shoulder joint. Axillary pouch of the shoulder can be seen on external rotation, while subscapular (subcoracoid) bursa can be seen on internal rotation of arm. The contrast should not enter subacromial bursa unless supraspinatus tendon is completely ruptured.

MRI with surface coils is used to image the shoulder joint.

== Additional images ==
Diagram of the human shoulder joint, front view

Diagram of the human shoulder joint, back view

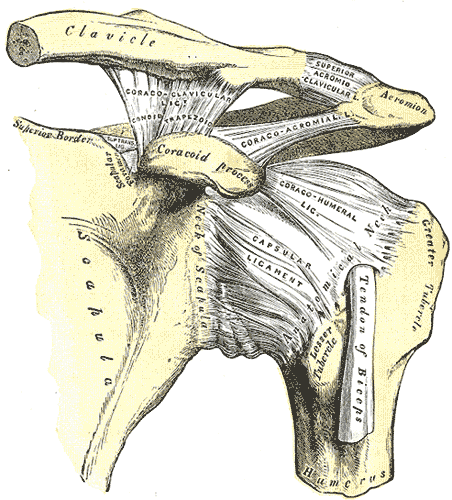
The left shoulder and acromioclavicular joints, and the proper ligaments of the scapula

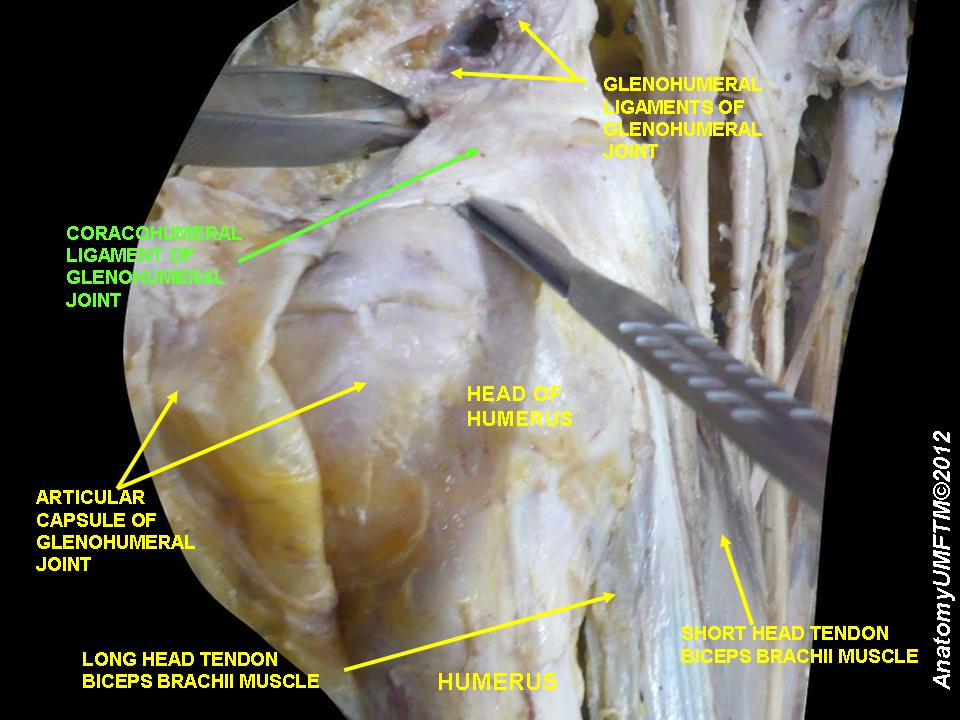
Dissection image of the coracohumeral ligament of the glenohumeral joint in green

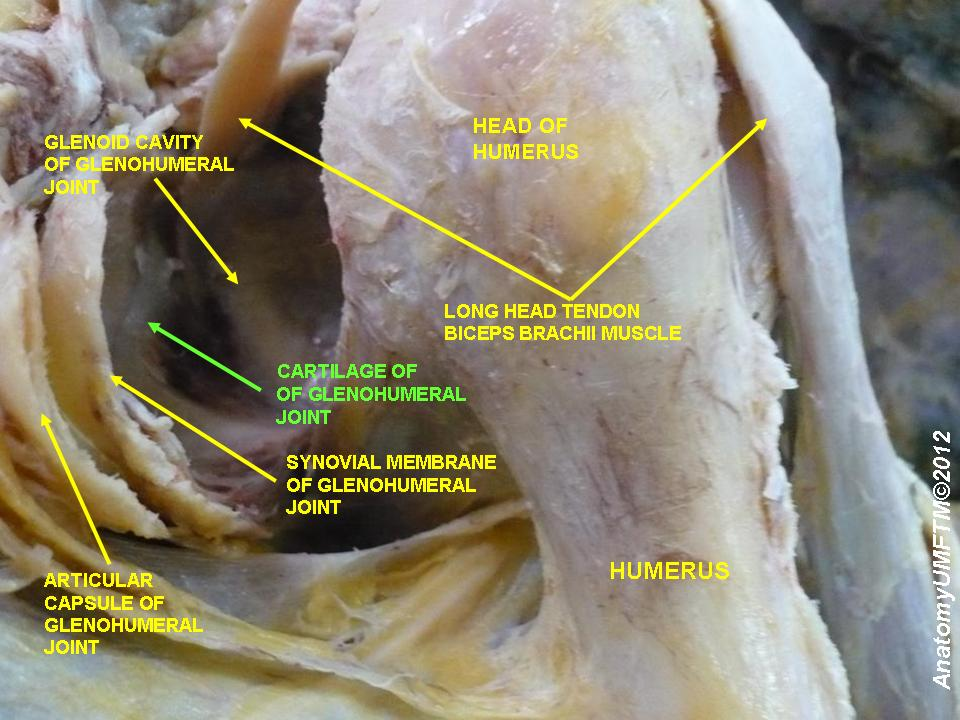
Dissection image of the cartilage of the glenohumeral joint in green

== See also ==
- Shoulder girdle
- Sternoclavicular joint
