= Axillary nerve palsy =

- Specialty: Emergency medicine

Axillary nerve palsy is a neurological condition in which the axillary (also called circumflex) nerve has been damaged by shoulder dislocation. It can cause weak deltoid and sensory loss below the shoulder. Since this is a problem with just one nerve, it is a type of Peripheral neuropathy called mononeuropathy. Of all brachial plexus injuries, axillary nerve palsy represents only .3% to 6% of them.

== Signs and symptoms ==
Axillary nerve palsy patients present themselves with differing symptoms. For instance, some axillary nerve palsy patients complain that they cannot bend their arm at the elbow, however no other pain or discomfort exists. To further complicate diagnosis, onset of palsy can be delayed and may not be noticed until 12-24 hours after the trauma of shoulder region occurred.

Symptoms include:

- unable to bend arm at the elbow
- deficiency of deltoid muscle function
- different regions of skin around the deltoid area can lack sensation
- unable to raise arm at the shoulder

== Causes ==
Anatomically, damage to the axillary nerve or suppression of it causes the palsy. This suppression, referred to as entrapment, causes the nerve pathway to become smaller and impulses cannot move through the nerve as easily. Furthermore, if trauma causes damage to the myelin sheath, or injures the nerve another way, this will also reduce the ability of nerve impulse flow.

Usually, an outside force is acting to suppress the nerve, or cause nerve damage. Most commonly, shoulder dislocation or fractions in the shoulder can cause the palsy. Contact sports such as football and hockey can cause the injury Other cases have been caused by repeated crutch pressure or injuries accidentally caused by health professionals (iatrogenesis). Furthermore, following an anterior shoulder operation; damage to the axillary nerve is possible and has been documented by various surgeons, thus causing axillary nerve palsy. Other possible causes include: deep infection, pressure from a cast or splint, fracture of the humerus, or nerve disorders in which the nerves become inflamed.

There are rare causes of axillary nerve palsy that do occur. For instance, axillary nerve palsy can occur after there is blunt trauma in the shoulder area without any sort of dislocation or fracture. Examples of this blunt trauma may include: being hit by heavy an object, falling on shoulder, a strong blow while participating in boxing, or motor vehicle accidents. Another rare cause of axillary nerve palsy can occur after utilizing a side birthing position. When the patient lies on their side for a strenuous amount of time, they can develop axillary nerve palsy. This rare complication of labor can occur due to the prolonged pressure on the axillary nerve while in a side-birth position. Some patients who are diagnosed with nodular fasciitis may develop axillary nerve palsy if the location of the rapid growth is near the axilla. In the case of Nodular Fasciitis, a fibrous band or the growth of a schwannoma can both press against the nerve, causing axillary nerve palsy. An injury to the axillary nerve normally occurs from a direct impact of some sort to the outer arm, though it can result from injuring a shoulder via dislocation or compression of the nerve. The axillary nerve comes from the posterior cord of the brachial plexus at the coracoid process and provides the motor function to the deltoid and teres minor muscles. An EMG can be useful in determining if there is an injury to the axillary nerve. The largest numbers of axillary nerve palsies arise due to stretch injuries which are caused by blunt trauma or iatrogenesis. Axillary nerve palsy is characterized by the lack of shoulder abduction greater than 30 degrees with or without the loss of sense in the low two thirds of the shoulder. Normally the patients that have axillary nerve palsy are involved in blunt trauma and have a number of shoulder injuries. Surgery is not always required to solve the problem (information from: Midha, Rajiv, Zager, Eric. Surgery of Peripheral Nerves: A Case-Based Approach. Thieme Medical Publishers, Inc. 2008.)

== Diagnosis ==
=== Medical Tests ===
A variety of methods may be used to diagnose axillary nerve palsy. The health practitioner may examine the shoulder for muscle atrophy of the deltoid muscle. Furthermore, a patient can also be tested for weakness when asked to raise the arm. The deltoid extension lag sign test is one way to evaluate the severity of the muscle weakness. During this test, the physician stands behind the patient and uses the patient's wrist to elevate the arm. Then, the patient is told to hold this position without the doctor's assistance. If the patient cannot hold this position on their own and an angular drop occurs, the angular lag is observed as an indicator of axillary nerve palsy. When the shoulder is at its maximum extension, only the posterior area of the deltoid muscle and the axillary nerve are working to raise the arm. Therefore, no other muscles can provide compensation, which allows the test to be an accurate measure of the axillary nerve’s dysfunction.

Additional testing includes electromyography (EMG) and nerve conduction tests. However, these should not be done right after the injury because results will be normal. These tests must be executed weeks after the initial injury and onset of symptoms. An MRI (magnetic resonance imaging) or X-ray may also be done by a doctor.

== Treatment ==
In many cases recovery happens spontaneously and no treatment is needed. This spontaneous recovery can occur because distance between the injury location and the deltoid muscle is small. Spontaneous recovery may take as long as 12 months.

In order to combat pain and inflammation of nerves, medication may be prescribed.

Surgery is an option, but it has mixed results within the literature and is usually avoided because only about half of people who undergo surgery see any positive results from it. Some suggest that surgical exploration should be considered if no recovery occurs after 3 to 6 months. Some surgical options include nerve grafting, neurolysis, or nerve reconstruction. Surgery results are typically better for younger patients (under 25) and for nerve grafts less than six centimeters.

For some, recovery does not occur and surgery is not possible. In these cases, most patients’ surrounding muscles can compensate, allowing them to gain a satisfactory range of motion back. Physical therapy or Occupational therapy will help retrain and gain muscle tone back.
