= Quadrangular space =

Anatomical region of the shoulder joint

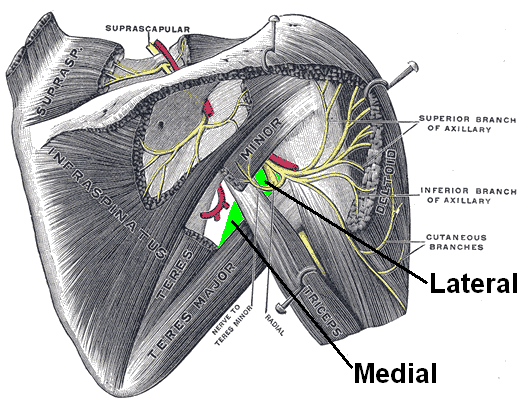
- Suprascapular and axillary nerves of right side, seen from behind. Quadrangular space is the lateral space, labeled in green at center right. Axillary nerve is visible entering it.

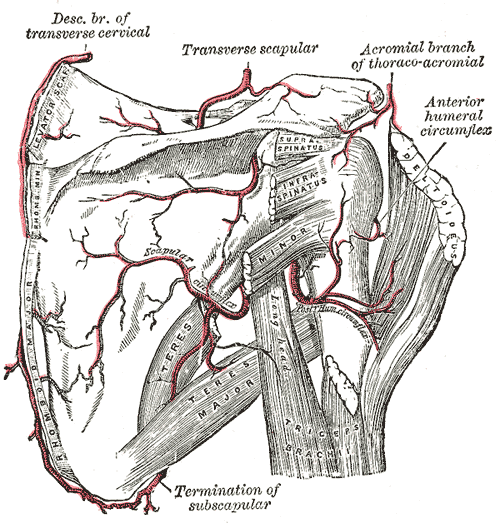
- The scapular and circumflex arteries. (Quadrangular space is visible but not labeled. Posterior humeral circumflex artery is visible entering quadrangular space at center right.)

The quadrangular space, also known as the quadrilateral of Velpeau and the foramen humerotricipitale, is one of the three spaces in the axillary space. The other two spaces are: triangular space and triangular interval.

== Structure ==
=== Boundaries ===
The quadrangular space is defined by:

- above/superior: teres minor muscle.
- below/inferior: teres major muscle.
- medially: long head of the triceps brachii muscle (lateral margin).
- laterally: surgical neck of the humerus.
- anteriorly: subscapularis muscle.

=== Contents ===
The quadrangular space transmits the axillary nerve, the posterior humeral circumflex artery and the posterior circumflex humeral vein.

== Clinical significance ==
The quadrangular space is a clinically important anatomic space in the arm as it provides the anterior regions of the axilla a passageway to the posterior regions. In the quadrangular space, the axillary nerve and the posterior humeral circumflex artery can be compressed or damaged due to space-occupying lesions or disruption in the anatomy due to trauma. Other common causes of axillary nerve compression at the quadrangular space include local compression due to osteophytes which are common in osteoarthritis, shoulder dislocations, fractures of the humeral neck, repetitive use, and external pressure (such as from crutches). Symptoms of axillary nerve compression include axillary nerve related weakness of the deltoid muscle (shoulder abduction) and teres minor (external rotation of the arm) as well as numbness of the lateral shoulder. The quadrangular space is the most common site of axillary nerve compression.

== History ==
The quadrangular space is so named because the three skeletal muscles and one long bone that form its boundaries leave a space in the shape of a complete quadrangle.

The quadrangular space is also known as the quadrilateral space, the quadrilateral space of Velpeau, and the foramen humerotricipitale.

== See also ==
- Quadrilateral space syndrome
- Triangular space
- Triangular interval

== Additional images ==
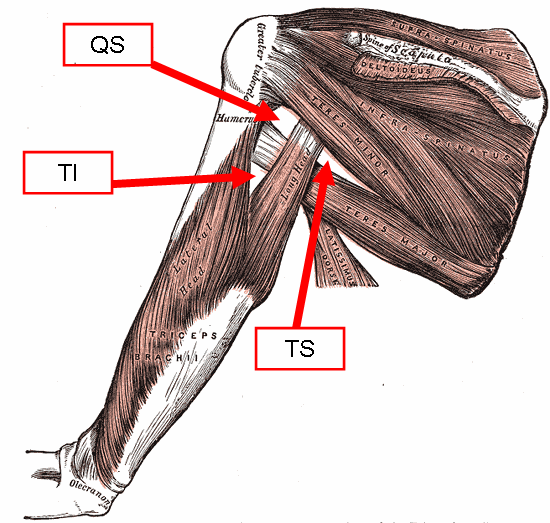
Muscles on the dorsum of the scapula, and the triceps brachii.
