= Circumflex scapular artery =

Artery of the upper body

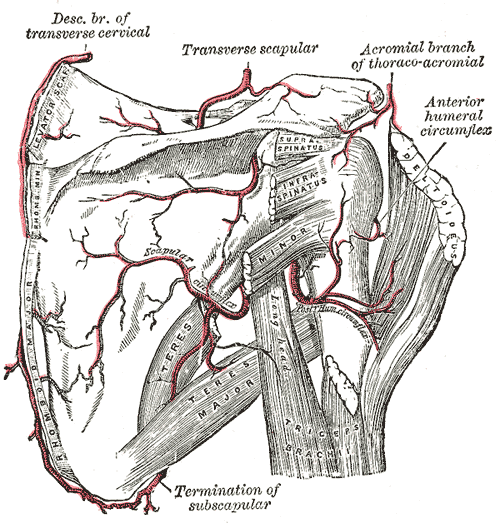
- The scapular and circumflex arteries. (Scapular circumflex visible at center.)

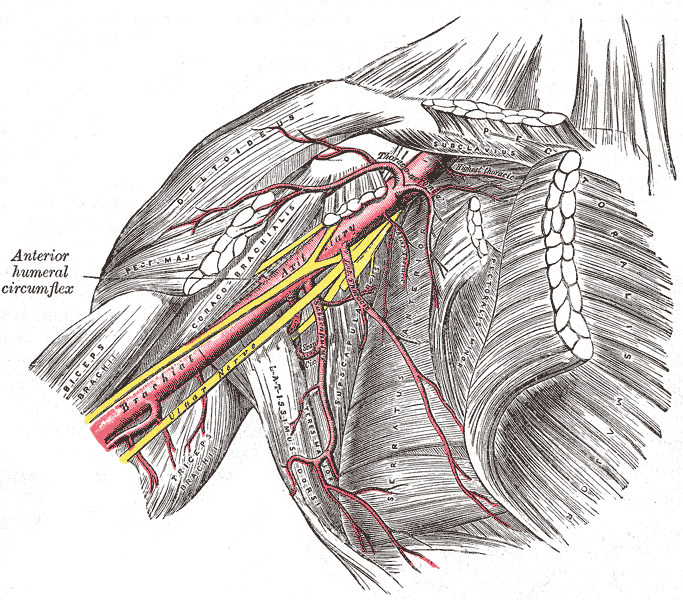
- The axillary artery and its branches. (Scap. cir. visible near center.)

Details
- Source: Subscapular artery

Identifiers
- Latin: arteria circumflexa scapulae
- TA98: A12.2.09.015
- TA2: 4629
- FMA: 23179

The circumflex scapular artery (scapular circumflex artery, dorsalis scapulae artery) is a branch of the subscapular artery and part of the scapular anastomoses.

It curves around the axillary border of the scapula, traveling through the anatomical "triangular space" made up of the teres minor superiorly, the teres major inferiorly, and the long head of the triceps laterally.

It enters the infraspinatous fossa under cover of the teres minor, and anastomoses with the transverse scapular artery (suprascapular) and the descending branch of the transverse cervical (a.k.a. dorsal scapular artery).

== Branches ==
In its course it gives off two branches:

- one (infrascapular) enters the subscapular fossa beneath the Subscapularis, which it supplies, anastomosing with the transverse scapular artery and the descending branch of the transverse cervical.
- the other is continued along the axillary border of the scapula, between the teres major and minor, and at the dorsal surface of the inferior angle anastomosis with the descending branch of the transverse cervical (dorsal scapular).

In addition to these, small branches are distributed to the back part of the deltoid and the long head of the Triceps brachii, anastomosing with an ascending branch of the deep artery of arm.
