= Posterior humeral circumflex artery =

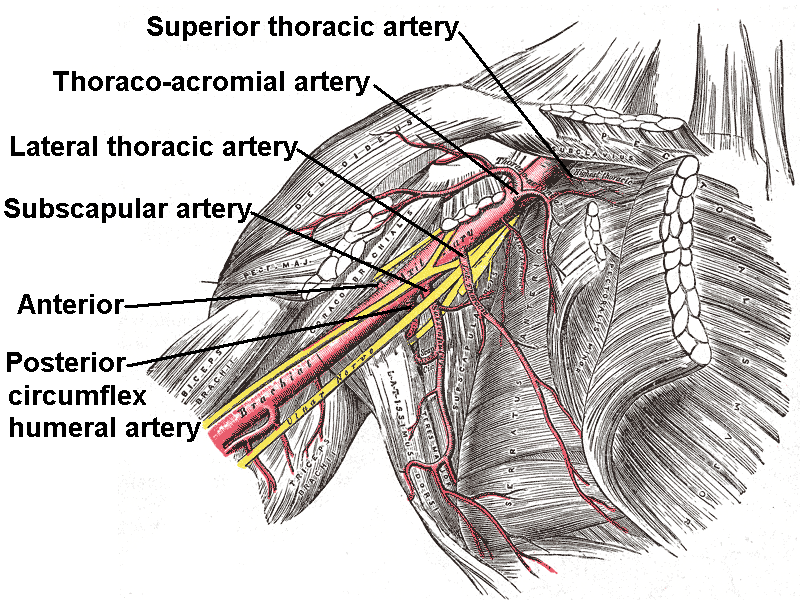
- The axillary artery and its branches, including posterior humeral circumflex.

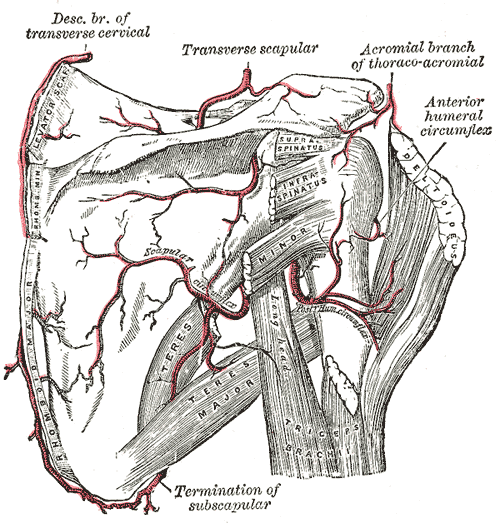
- The scapular and circumflex arteries. (Posterior hum. circumflex labeled at center right.)

Details
- Source: Axillary artery

Identifiers
- Latin: arteria circumflexa humeri posterior
- TA98: A12.2.09.017
- TA2: 4631
- FMA: 22684

The posterior humeral circumflex artery (posterior circumflex artery or posterior circumflex humeral artery) arises from the third part of the axillary artery at the distal border of the subscapularis.

== Anatomy ==
=== Course and relations ===
It passes posteriorward with the axillary nerve through the quadrangular space. It winds laterally around the surgical neck of the humerus.

=== Distribution ===
It is distributed to the shoulder joint, teres major, teres minor, deltoid, and (long and lateral heads of) triceps brachii.

=== Anastomoses ===
It forms anastomoses with the anterior humeral circumflex artery, (deltoid branch of) profunda brachii artery, (acromial branches of) suprascapular artery, (acromial branches of) and thoracoacromial artery.

== Additional images ==
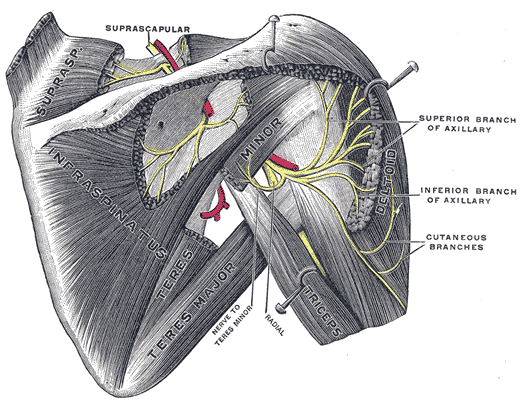
Suprascapular and axillary nerves of right side, seen from behind.

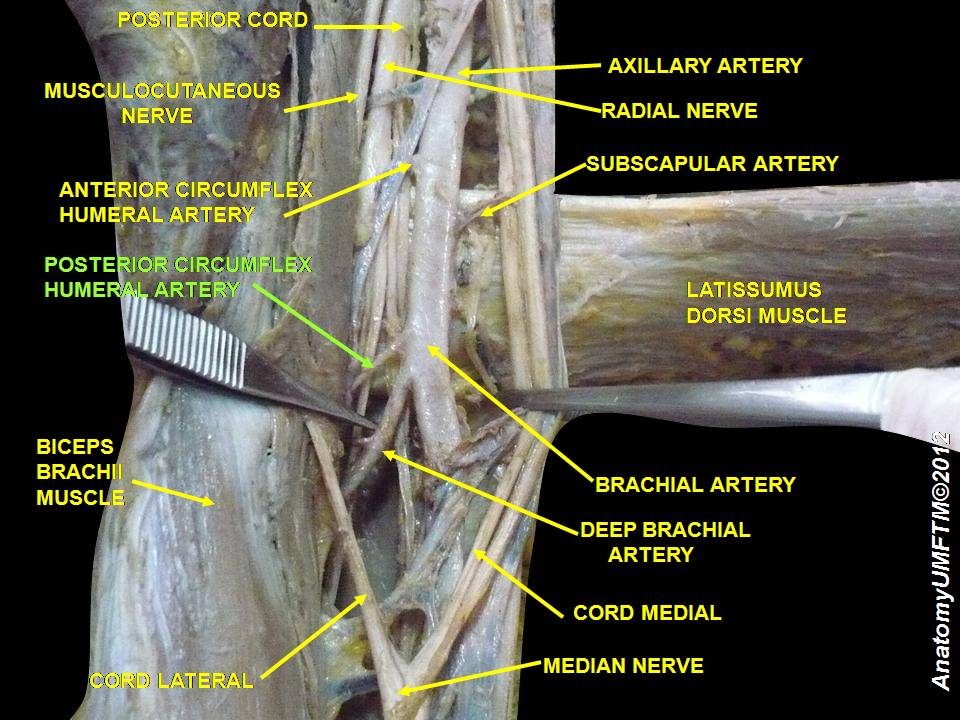
Posterior humeral circumflex artery

== See also ==
- Anterior humeral circumflex artery
