= Axillary nerve =

Nerve of the human body near the armpit

- Brachial plexus. (Axillary nerve is visible in gray near center.)

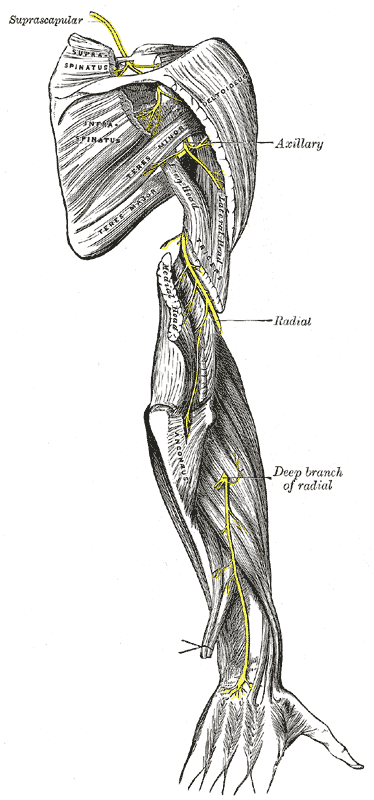
- The suprascapular, axillary, and radial nerves. (Axillary labeled at upper right.)

Details
- From: Posterior cord (C5, C6)
- Innervates: Deltoid, teres minor

Identifiers
- Latin: nervus axillaris
- TA98: A14.2.03.059
- TA2: 6440
- FMA: 37072

The axillary nerve or the circumflex nerve is a nerve of the human body, that originates from the brachial plexus (upper trunk, posterior division, posterior cord) at the level of the axilla (armpit) and carries nerve fibers from C5 and C6. The axillary nerve travels through the quadrangular space with the posterior circumflex humeral artery and vein to innervate the deltoid and teres minor.

== Structure ==
The nerve lies at first behind the axillary artery, and in front of the subscapularis, and passes downward to the lower border of that muscle.

It then winds from anterior to posterior around the neck of the humerus, in company with the posterior humeral circumflex artery, through the quadrangular space (bounded above by the teres minor, below by the teres major, medially by the long head of the triceps brachii, and laterally by the surgical neck of the humerus), and divides into an anterior, a posterior, and a collateral branch to the long head of the triceps brachii branch.

- The anterior branch (upper branch) winds around the surgical neck of the humerus, beneath the deltoid muscle, with the posterior humeral circumflex vessels. It continues as far as the anterior border of the deltoid to provide motor innervation. The anterior branch also gives off a few small cutaneous branches, which pierce the muscle and supply in the overlaying skin.
- The posterior branch (lower branch) supplies the teres minor and the posterior part of the deltoid. The posterior branch pierces the deep fascia and continues as the superior (or upper) lateral cutaneous nerve of arm, which sweeps around the posterior border of the deltoid and supplies the skin over the lower two-thirds of the posterior part of this muscle, as well as that covering the long head of the triceps brachii.
- The motor branch of the long head of the triceps brachii arises, on average, a distance of 6 mm (range 2–12 mm) from the terminal division of the posterior cord termination.
- The trunk of the axillary nerve gives off an articular filament which enters the shoulder joint below the subscapularis.

=== Variation ===
Traditionally, the axillary nerve is thought to only supply the deltoid and teres minor. However, several studies on cadavers pointed out that the long head of triceps brachii is innervated by a branch of the axillary nerve.

== Function ==
The axillary nerve supplies two muscles in the arm: deltoid (a muscle of the shoulder) and teres minor (one of the rotator cuff muscles).

The axillary nerve also carries sensory information from the shoulder joint. It also innervates the skin, covering the inferior region of the deltoid muscle, known as the regimental badge area. This is innervated by the superior lateral cutaneous nerve branch of the axillary nerve.

The posterior cord of the brachial plexus splits inferiorly to the glenohumeral joint giving rise to the axillary nerve which wraps around the surgical neck of the humerus, and the radial nerve which wraps around the humerus anteriorly and descends along its lateral border.

== Clinical significance ==
The axillary nerve may be injured in anterior-inferior dislocations of the shoulder joint, compression of the axilla with a crutch or fracture of the surgical neck of the humerus. An example of injury to the axillary nerve includes axillary nerve palsy. Injury to the nerve results in:

- Paralysis of the teres minor muscle and deltoid muscle, resulting in loss of abduction of arm (from 15-90 degrees), weak flexion, extension, and rotation of shoulder. Paralysis of deltoid and teres minor muscles results in flat shoulder deformity.
- Loss of sensation in the skin over the regimental badge area.

Direct trauma to the nerve can also lead to paralysis and loss of sensation.

== Additional images ==
Brachial plexus with courses of spinal nerves shown

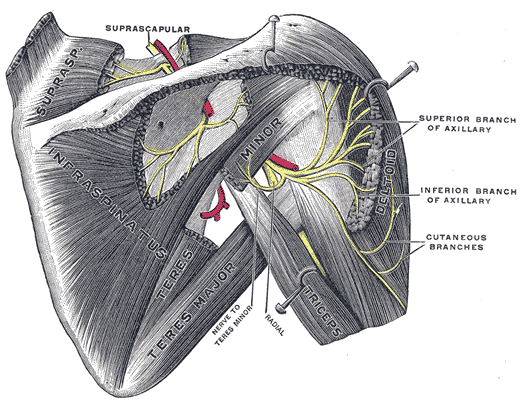
Suprascapular and axillary nerves of right side, seen from behind.

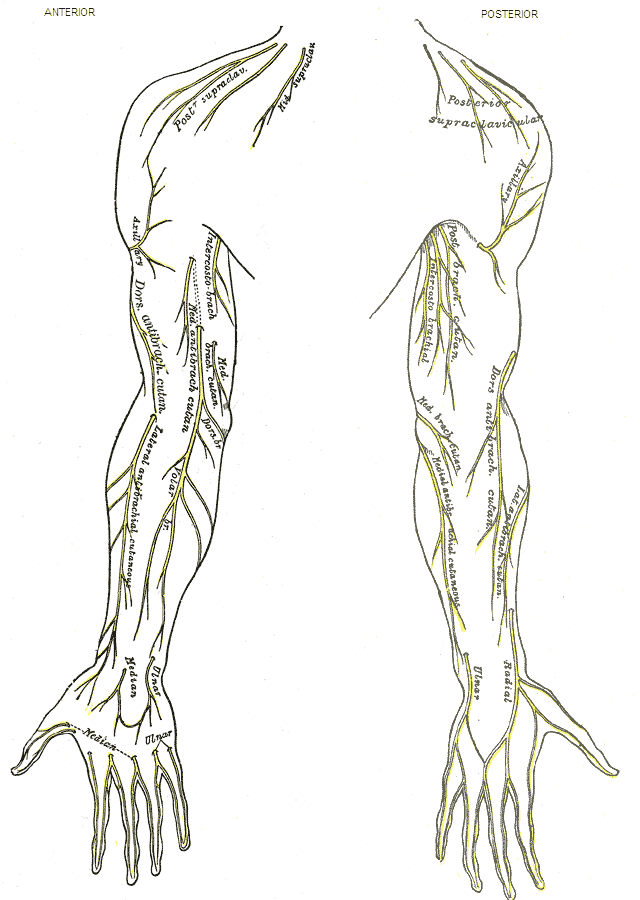
Cutaneous nerves of right upper extremity.

Diagram of segmental distribution of the cutaneous nerves of the right upper extremity.

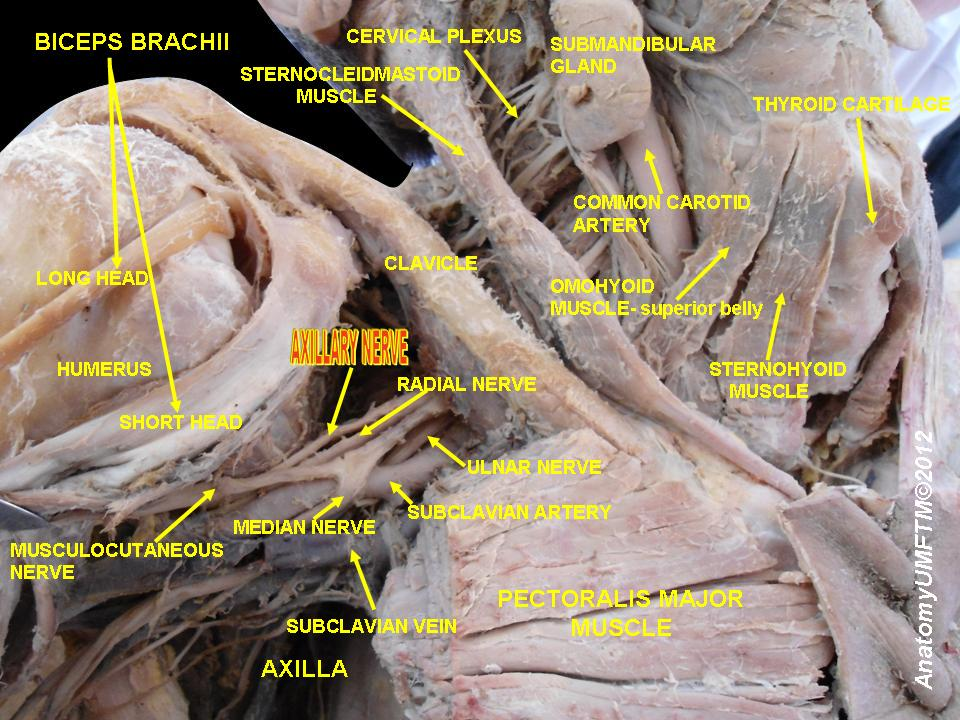
Axillary nerve

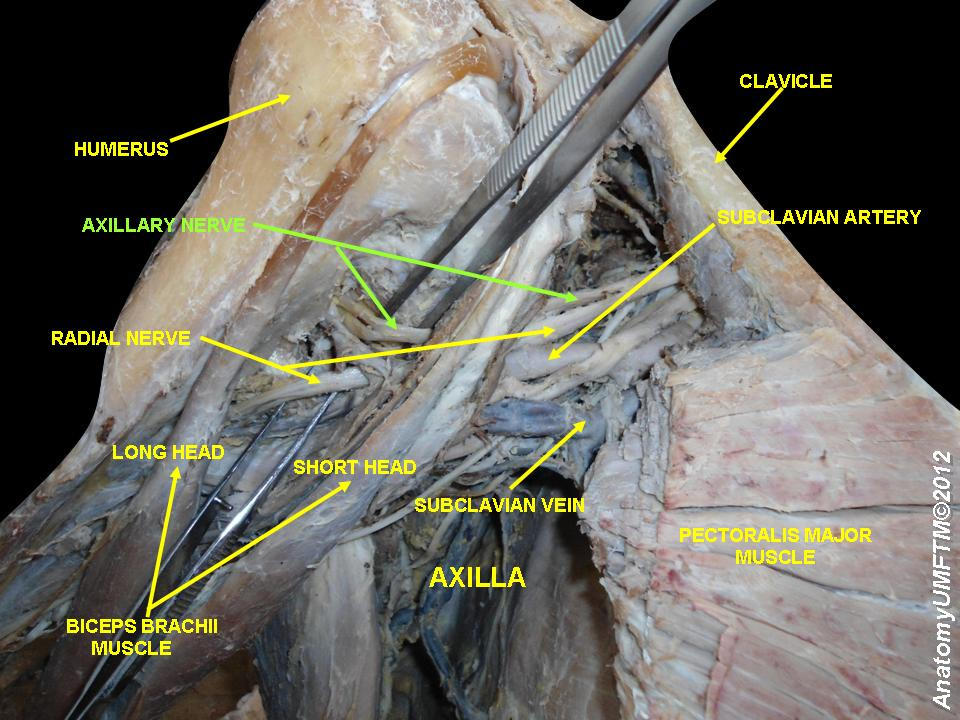
Axillary nerve

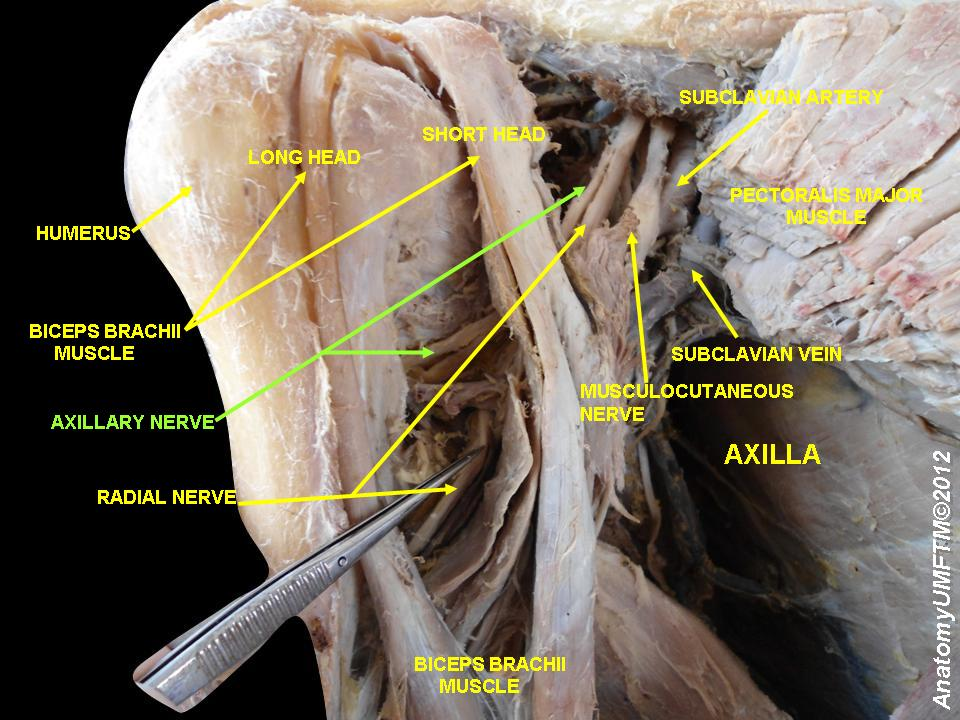
Axillary nerve

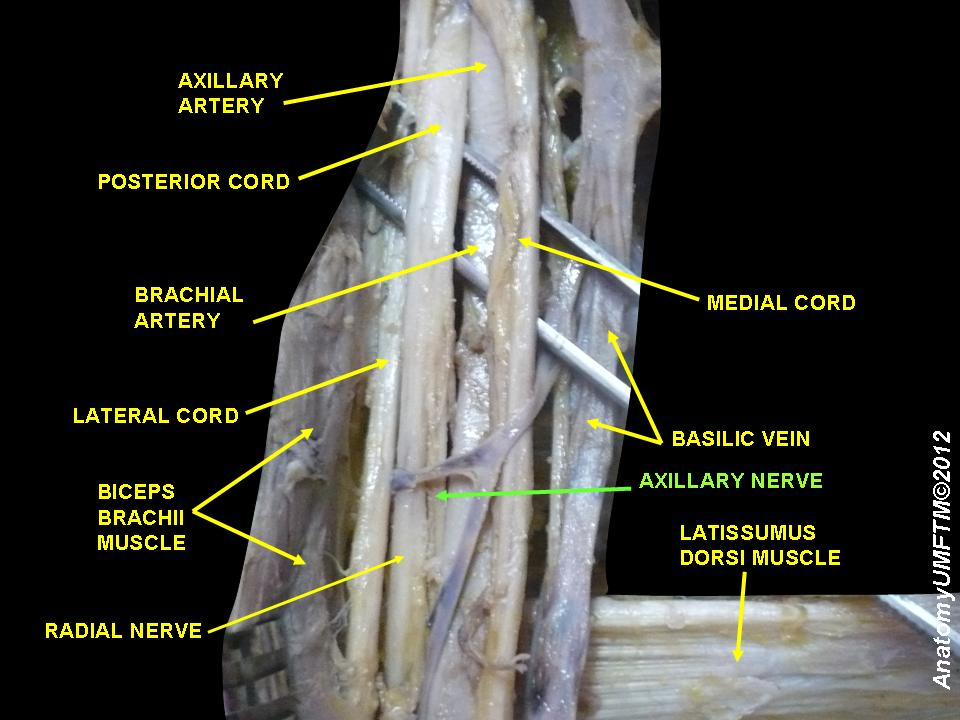
Axillary nerve

== See also ==
- Axillary nerve dysfunction
