= Teres minor muscle =

Muscle of the rotator cuff

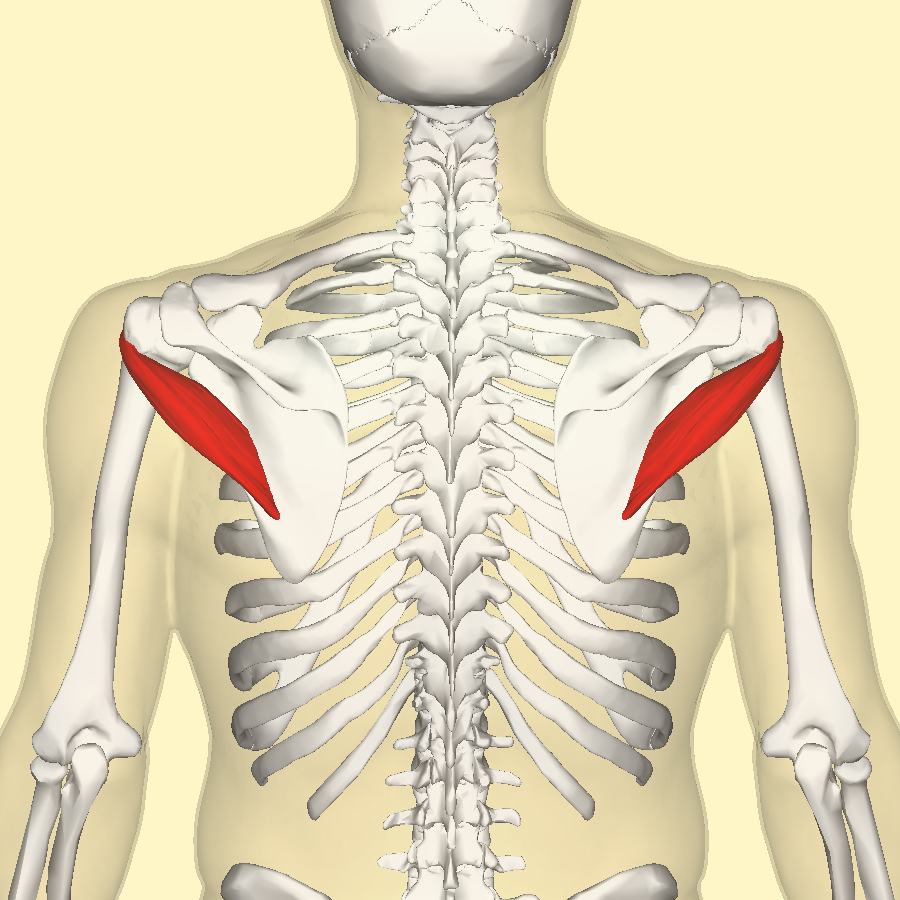
- Teres minor muscle (shown in red), seen from behind

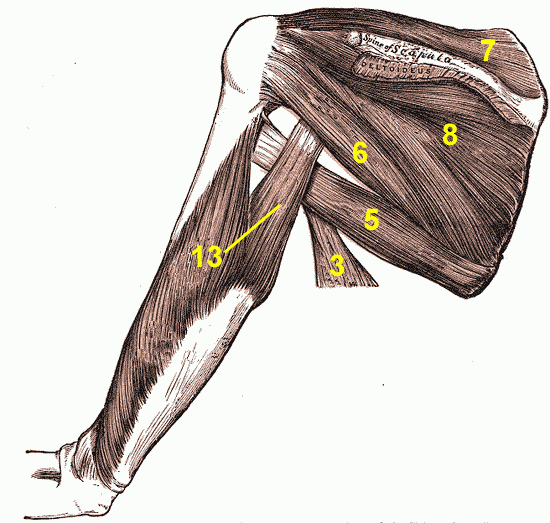
- Muscles on the dorsum of the left scapula, and the Triceps brachii muscle: #3 is Latissimus dorsi muscle #5 is Teres major muscle #6 is Teres minor muscle #7 is Supraspinatus muscle #8 is Infraspinatus muscle #13 is long head of Triceps brachii muscle

Details
- Origin: Lateral border of the scapula
- Insertion: Inferior facet of greater tubercle of the humerus
- Artery: Posterior circumflex humeral artery and the circumflex scapular artery
- Nerve: Axillary nerve (C5-C6)
- Actions: Laterally rotates the arm, stabilizes humerus

Identifiers
- Latin: musculus teres minor
- TA98: A04.6.02.010
- TA2: 2459
- FMA: 32550

The teres minor (Latin teres meaning 'rounded') is a narrow, elongated muscle of the rotator cuff. The muscle originates from the lateral border and adjacent posterior surface of the corresponding right or left scapula and inserts at both the greater tubercle of the humerus and the posterior surface of the joint capsule.

The primary function of the teres minor is to modulate the action of the deltoid, preventing the humeral head from sliding upward as the arm is abducted. It also functions to rotate the humerus laterally. The teres minor is innervated by the axillary nerve.

== Structure ==
It arises from the dorsal surface of the axillary border of the scapula for the upper two-thirds of its extent, and from two aponeurotic laminae, one of which separates it from the infraspinatus muscle, the other from the teres major muscle.

Its fibers run obliquely upwards and laterally; the upper ones end in a tendon which is inserted into the lowest of the three impressions on the greater tubercle of the humerus; the lowest fibers are inserted directly into the humerus immediately below this impression.

A normal anatomical variant of this is a much smaller appearing muscle with an intact tendon. This is referred to as the teres minimis; some literature refer to it as teres micro.

=== Relations ===
The teres minor originates at the lateral border and adjacent posterior surface of the scapula. It inserts at the greater tubercle of the humerus. The tendon of this muscle passes across, and is united with, the posterior part of the capsule of the shoulder-joint.

=== Innervation ===
The muscle is innervated by the posterior branch of axillary nerve where it forms a pseudoganglion. A pseudoganglion has no nerve cells but nerve fibres are present. Damage to the fibers innervating the teres minor is clinically significant.

=== Variation ===
Sometimes a group of muscle fibres from teres minor may be fused with infraspinatus.

== Function ==
The infraspinatus and teres minor attach to head of the humerus; as part of the rotator cuff they help hold the humeral head in the glenoid cavity of the scapula. They work in tandem with the posterior deltoid to externally (laterally) rotate the humerus, as well as adduction. Teres minor can produce only very small scapular plane adduction during maximal contraction (Hughes RE, An KN 1996) with adductor moment arm of approximately 0.2 cm at 45° of shoulder internal rotation and approximately 0.1 cm at 45° of shoulder external rotation.

== Clinical significance ==
=== Injury ===
There are two types of rotator cuff injuries: acute tears and chronic tears.

Acute tears occur as a result of a sudden movement. This might include throwing a powerful pitch, holding a fast moving rope during water sports, falling over onto an outstretched hand at speed, or making a sudden thrust with the paddle in kayaking.

A chronic tear develops over a period of time. They usually occur at or near the tendon, as a result of the tendon rubbing against the underlying bone. The teres minor is typically normal following a rotator cuff tear.

=== Imaging ===
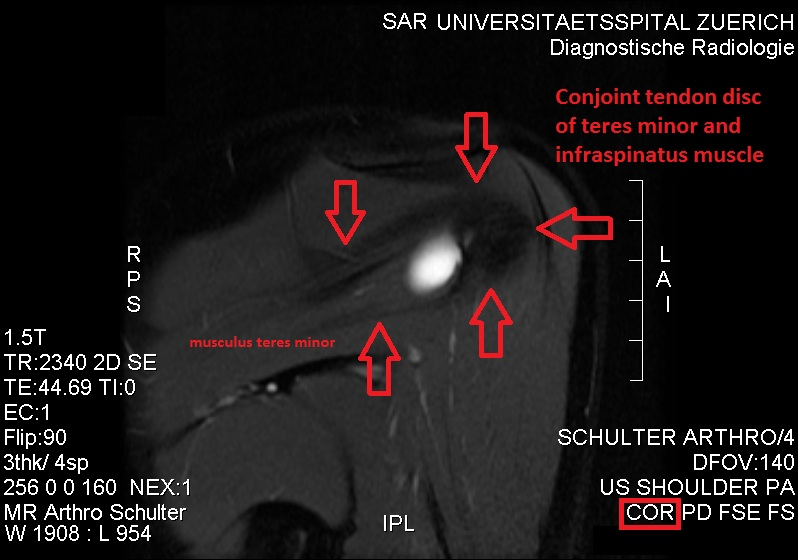
Conjoint and intact tendon disc of teres minor and infraspinatus muscle

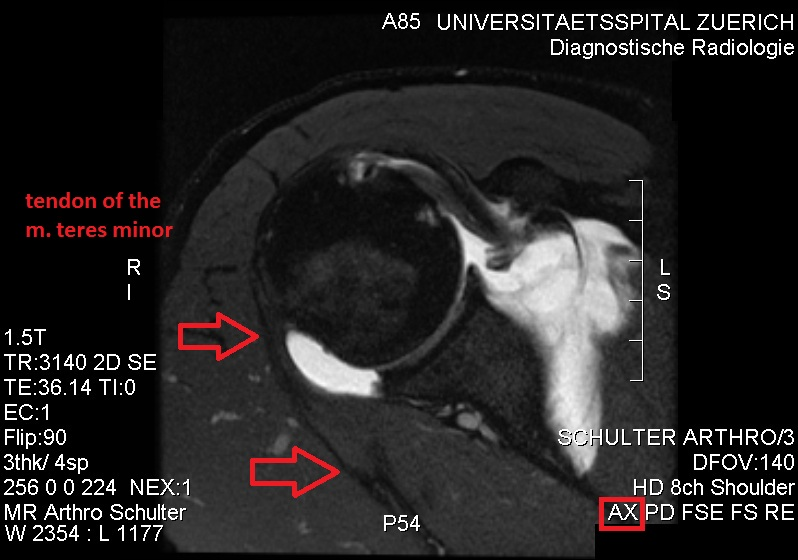
Intact teres minor tendon with physiologically hypointense signal

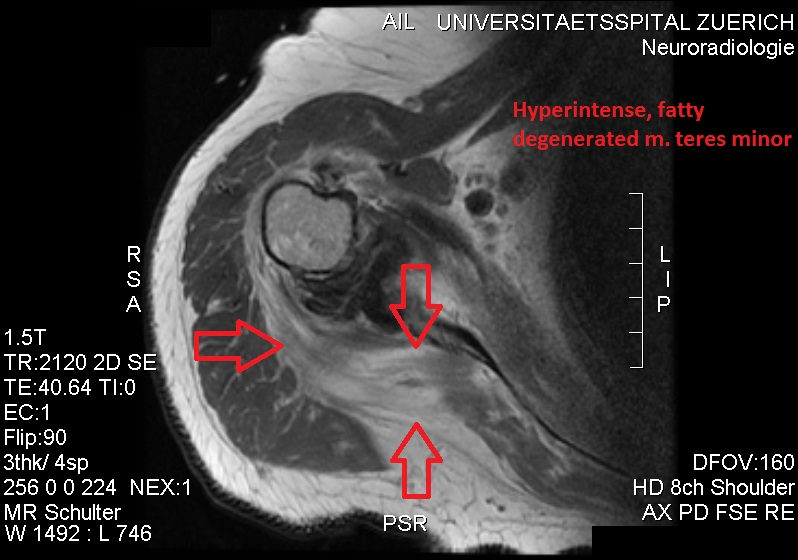
Hyperintense, fatty degenerated teres minor muscle

Atrophy of the teres minor muscle is often a consequence of a rotator cuff tear, but common isolated teres minor atrophies have also been found. A quadrangular space syndrome causes excessive and or chronically compression of the structures which pass through this anatomical tunnel. The axillary nerve and the posterior humeral circumflex artery pass through the space. People affected note shoulder pain and paresthesia down the arm first and foremost in abduction, extension, external rotation and overhead activity. Selective atrophy of the teres minor muscle has been seen and pulled together directly with compression of the corresponding axillary nerve branch or posterior humeral circumflex artery. Fibrous bands, cysts of the glenoid labrum, lipoma or dilated veins can occupy the quadrilateral space pathologically. Similar symptoms are common with anterior shoulder dislocation, humeral neck fracture, brachial plexus injury and thoracic outlet and inlet syndrome. It is important to include those pathologies for a complete as possible differential diagnosis.

Ultrasonography is a tool to detect a fatty degenerative atrophy of the teres minor and shows in affected muscles increased echogenicity and betimes a slight reduction in muscle bulk. MR imaging helps to consolidate the diagnosis of neurogenic muscle atrophy. Extracellular edema after traumatic events causing neural damage show an increased signal intensity on T2-weighted MRI sequences and normal intensity on T1-weighted sequences. Posterior humeral circumflex artery compression and reduced blood flow in stressful arm positions and or maneuvers can be diagnosed by a Doppler ultrasonography. The nerve should be detected adjacent to the vessel. In an elevated arm position the axillary neurovascular bundle can be seen at the posterior axillary fold just before it perforates the deltoideus, while the posterior course is well visible in the neutral position. For a detailed assessment of the artery, a MR angiography is required. The major task of an ultrasonographic examination is to rule out any space occupying mass. Additional electromyography is helpful to reveal any decelerated nerve conduction velocity, and thus denervation of the concerned muscle.

== Additional images ==
Position of the teres minor muscles (shown in red). Animation.

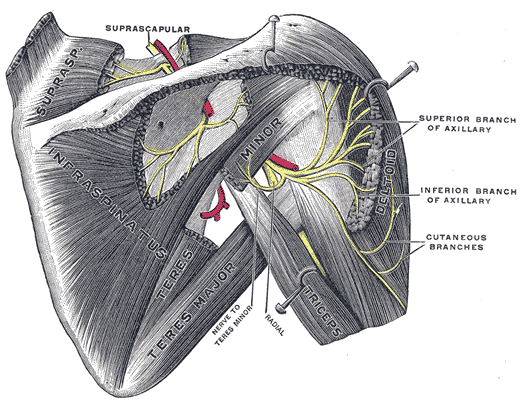
Suprascapular and axillary nerves of right side, seen from behind. (Teres minor is visible at center.)

Diagram of the human shoulder joint, front view

Diagram of the human shoulder joint, back view

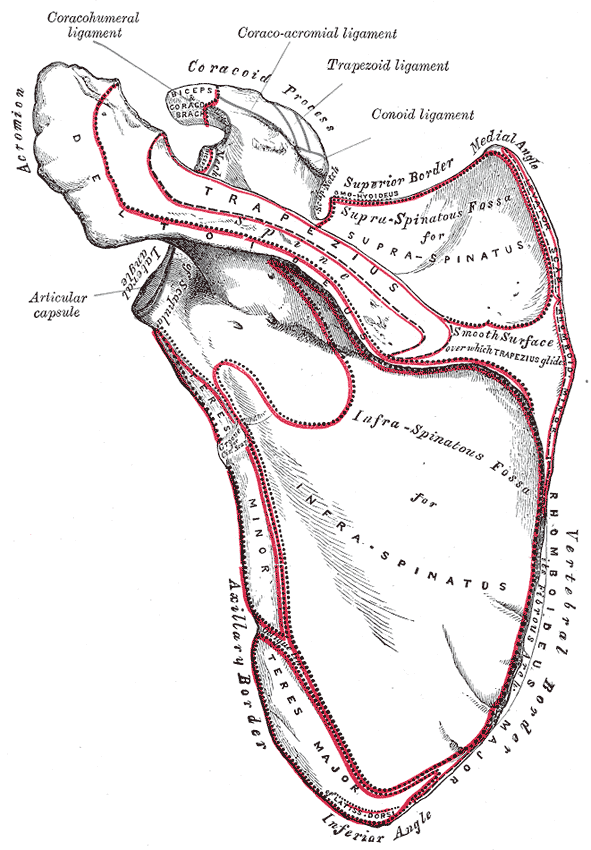
Left scapula. Dorsal surface.

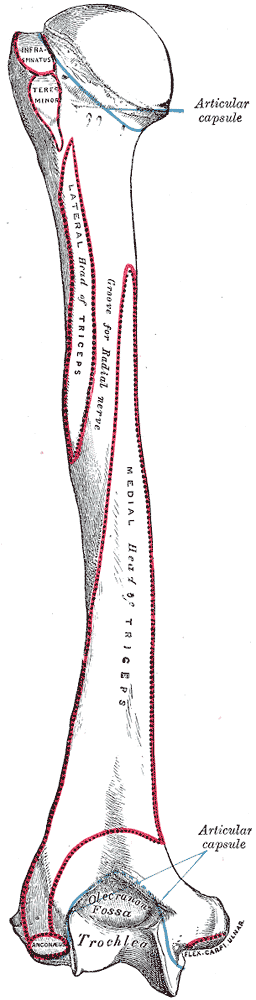
Left humerus. Posterior view.

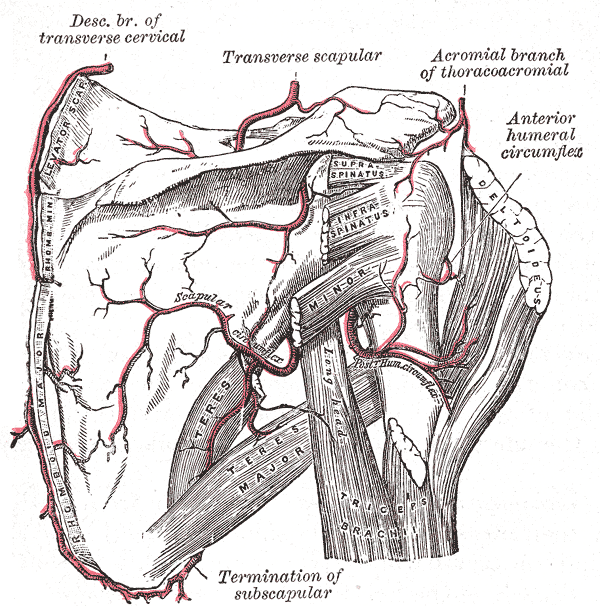
The scapular and circumflex arteries

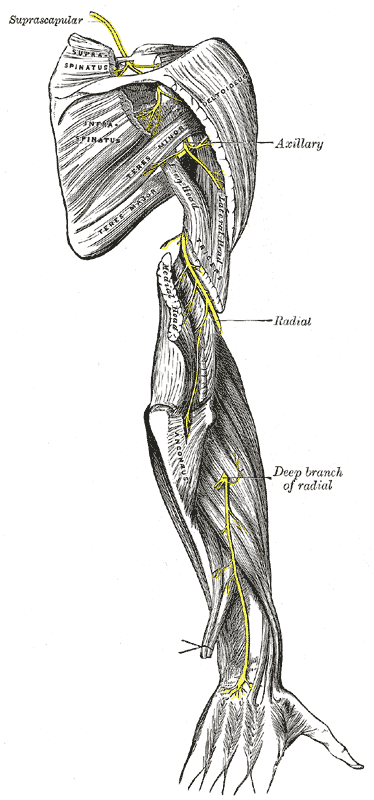
The suprascapular, axillary, and radial nerves

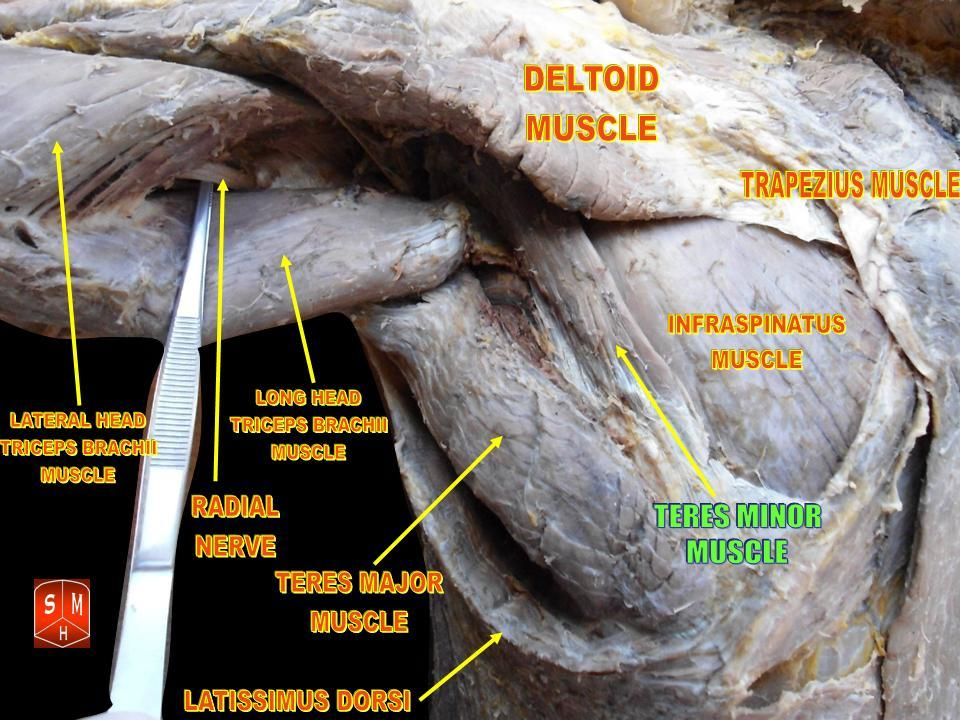
Teres minor muscle

== See also ==
- Accessory muscles of the scapula
