= Deltoid muscle =

Shoulder muscle

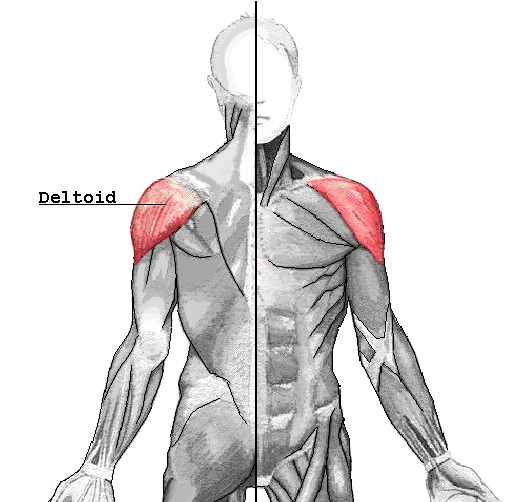
- Deltoid muscle

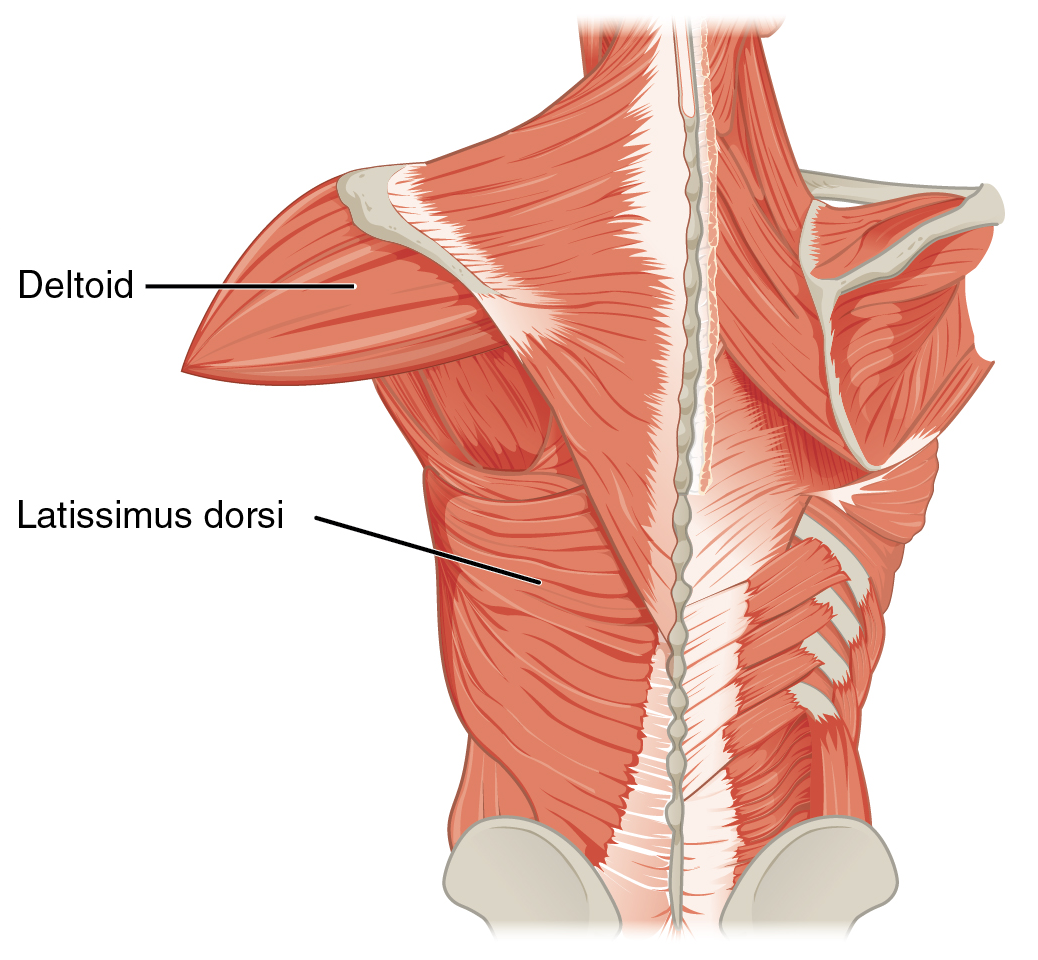
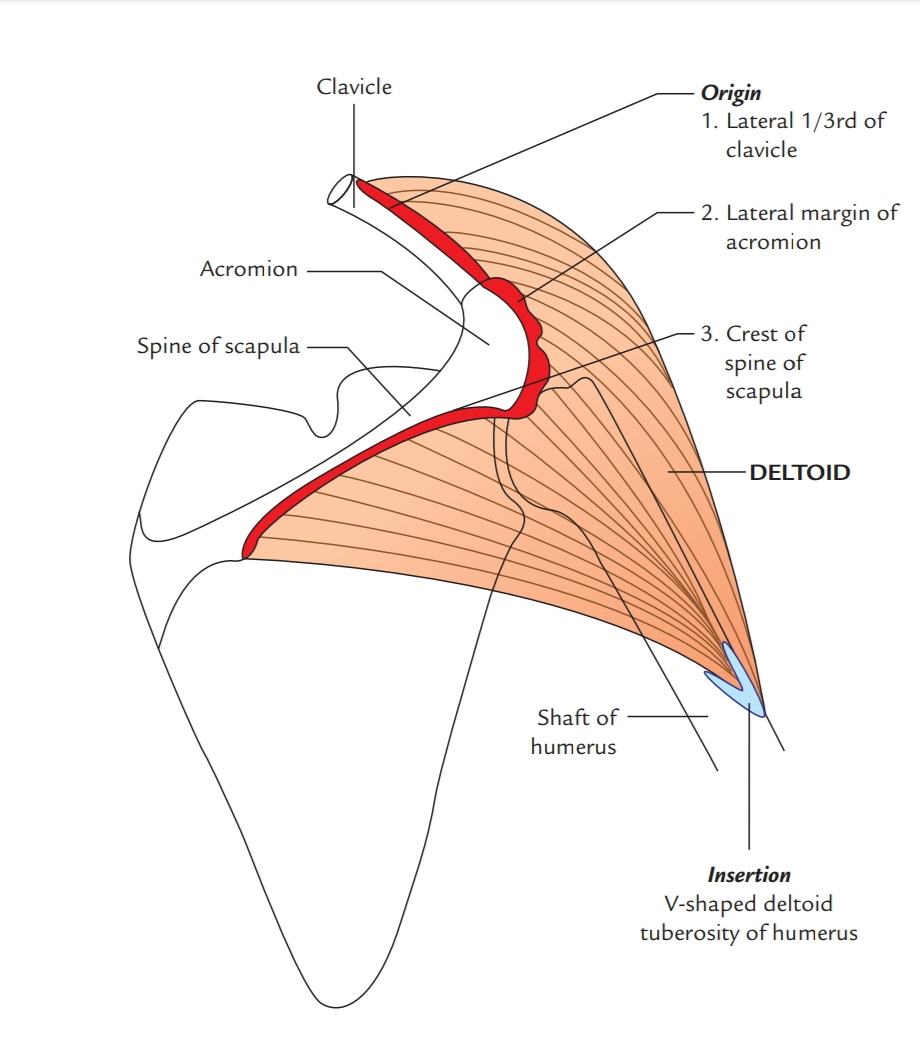
- Muscles connecting the upper extremity to the vertebral column Origin and insertion of deltoid muscle

Details
- Origin: The anterior border and upper surface of the lateral third of the clavicle, acromion, spine of the scapula
- Insertion: Deltoid tuberosity of humerus
- Artery: Thoracoacromial artery, anterior and posterior humeral circumflex artery
- Nerve: Axillary nerve
- Actions: Shoulder abduction, flexion and extension
- Antagonist: Latissimus dorsi

Identifiers
- Latin: musculus deltoideus
- MeSH: D057645
- TA98: A04.6.02.002
- TA2: 2452
- FMA: 32521

The deltoid muscle (or musculus deltoideus) is the muscle forming the rounded contour of the human shoulder. It is also known as the 'common shoulder muscle', particularly in other animals such as the domestic cat. Anatomically, the deltoid muscle is made up of three distinct sets of muscle fibers, namely the

1. anterior deltoid or clavicular part (pars clavicularis)
2. posterior or scapular part (pars scapularis)
3. intermediate or acromial part (pars acromialis)

The deltoid's fibres are pennate muscle. However, electromyography suggests that it consists of at least seven groups that can be independently coordinated by the nervous system.

It was previously called the deltoideus (plural deltoidei) and the name is still used by some anatomists. It is called so because it is in the shape of the Greek capital letter delta (Δ). Deltoid is also further shortened in slang as "delt".

A study of 30 shoulders revealed an average mass of 192 grams (6.8 oz) in humans, ranging from 84 grams (3.0 oz) to 366 grams (12.9 oz).

== Structure ==
=== Origin ===
1. The anterior or clavicular fibers arise from most of the anterior border and upper surface of the lateral third of the clavicle. The anterior origin lies adjacent to the lateral fibers of the pectoralis major muscle as do the end tendons of both muscles. These muscle fibers are closely related and only a small chiasmatic space, through which the cephalic vein passes, prevents the two muscles from forming a continuous muscle mass.
2. Intermediate or acromial fibers arise from the superior surface of the acromion process of the scapula.
3. Posterior or spinal fibers arise from the lower lip of the posterior border of the spine of the scapula.

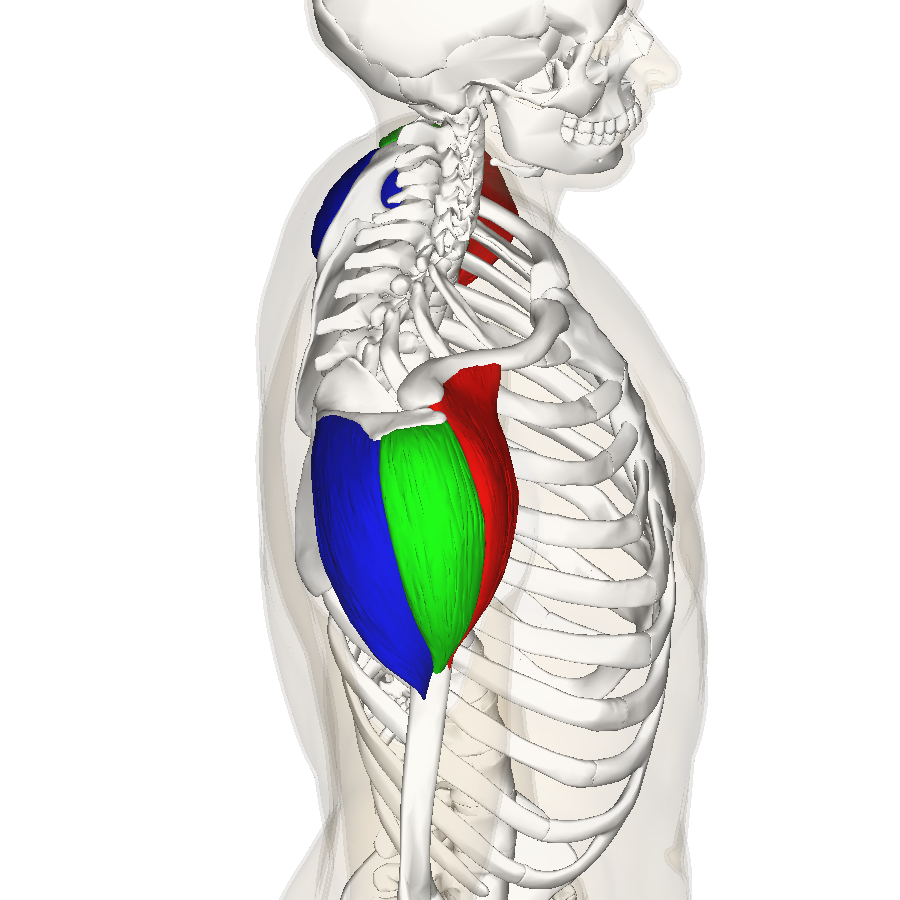
Side.

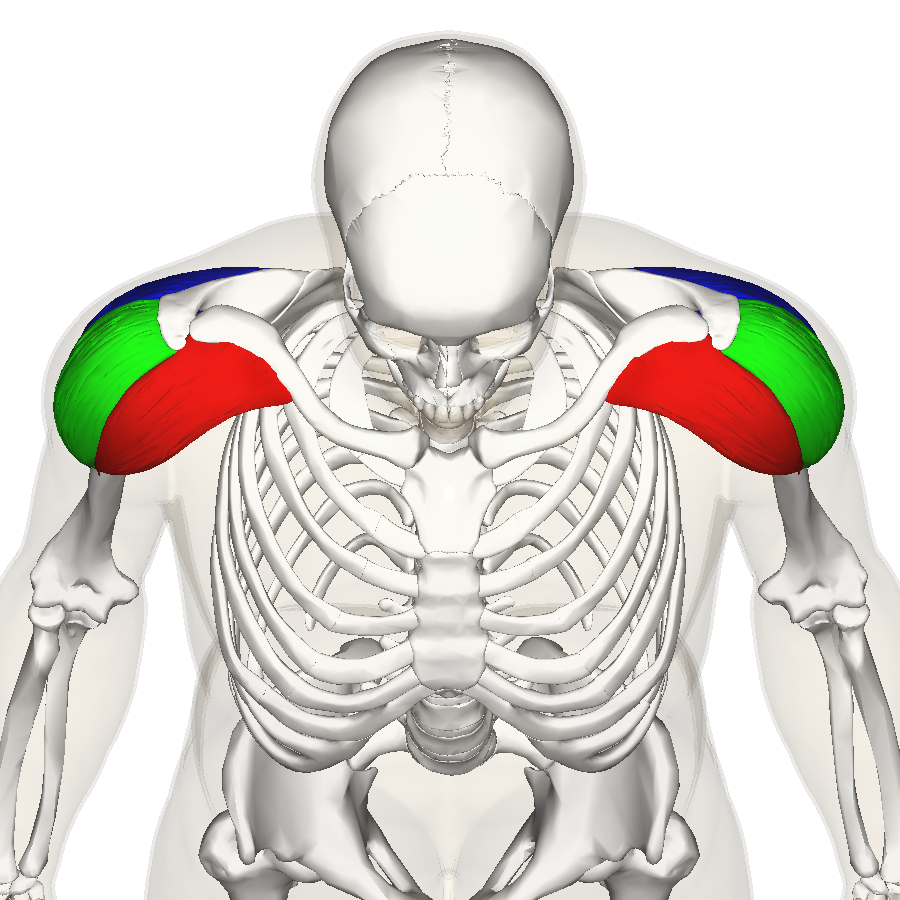
Front.

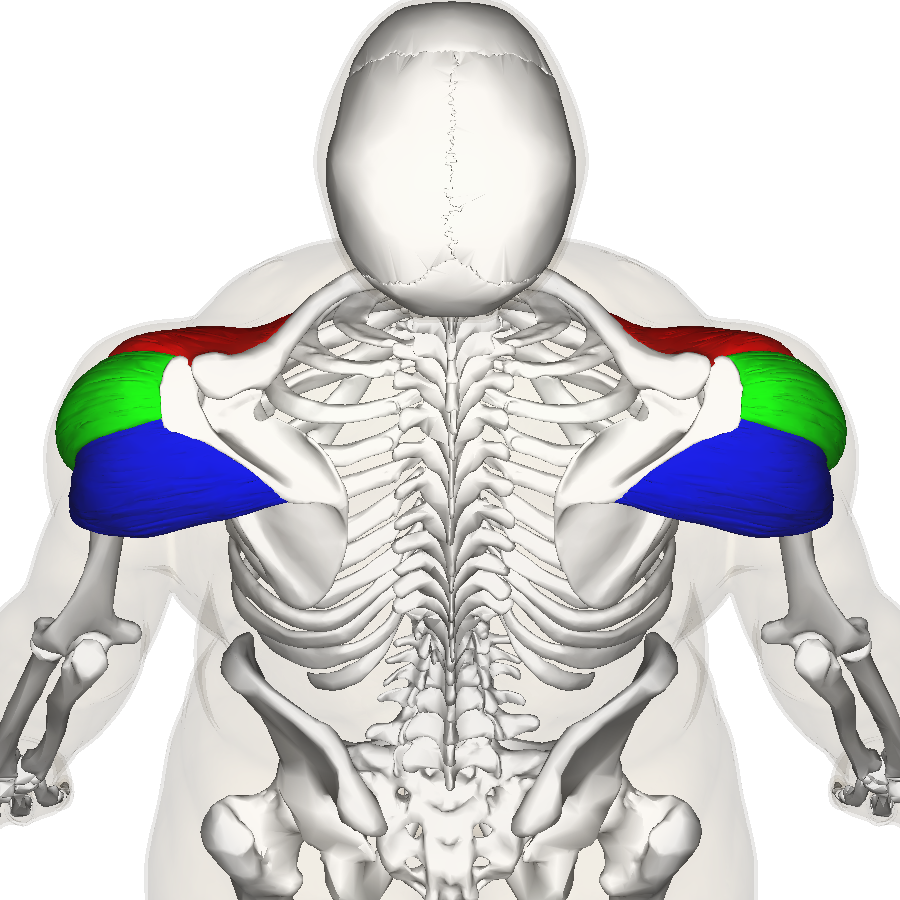
Back.

Animation.

Deltoid muscle.
Anterior part of deltoid (arises from most of the anterior border and upper surface of the lateral third of the clavicle.)
Intermediate part of deltoid (arises from the superior surface of the acromion process.)
Posterior part of deltoid (arises from the lower lip of the posterior border of the spine of the scapula.)

=== Insertion ===
From this extensive origin the fibers converge toward their insertion on the deltoid tuberosity on the middle of the lateral aspect of the shaft of the humerus; the intermediate fibers passing vertically, the anterior obliquely backward and laterally, and the posterior obliquely forward and laterally.

Though traditionally described as a single insertion, the deltoid insertion is divided into two or three discernible areas corresponding to the muscle's three areas of origin. The insertion is an arch-like structure with strong anterior and posterior fascial connections flanking an intervening tissue bridge. It additionally gives off extensions to the deep brachial fascia. Furthermore, the deltoid fascia contributes to the brachial fascia and is connected to the medial and lateral intermuscular septa.

=== Blood supply ===
The deltoid is supplied by the thoracoacromial artery (acromial and deltoid branches), the circumflex humeral arteries, and the profunda brachii artery (deltoid branch).

=== Nerve supply ===
The deltoid is innervated by the axillary nerve. The axillary nerve originates from the anterior rami of the cervical nerves C5 and C6, via the superior trunk, posterior division of the superior trunk, and the posterior cord of the brachial plexus.

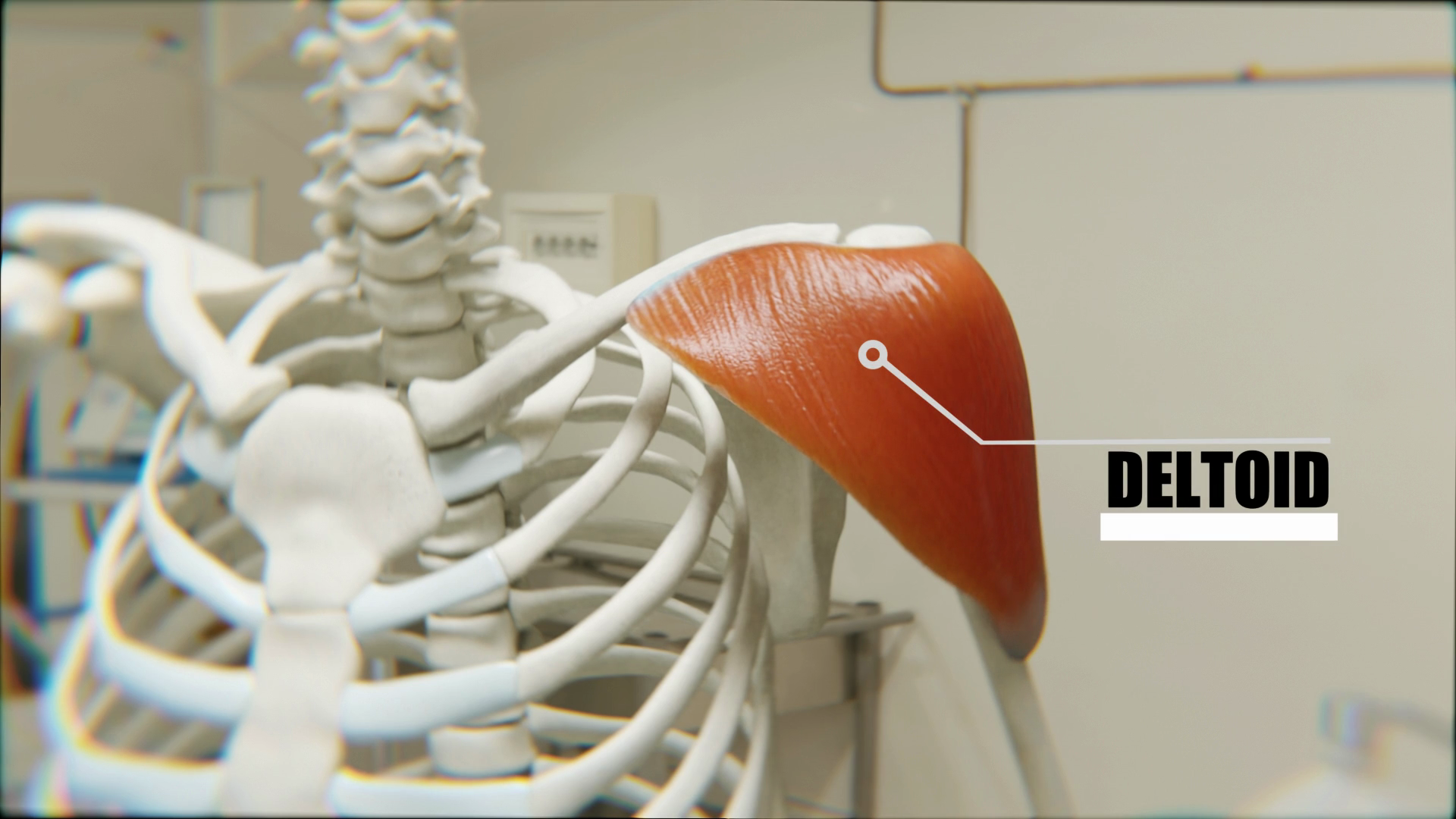
Deltoid Muscle Labelled

Studies have shown that there are seven neuromuscular segments to the deltoid muscle. Three of these lie in the anatomical anterior head of the deltoid, one in the anatomical middle head, and three in the anatomical posterior head of the deltoid. These neuromuscular segments are supplied by smaller branches of the axillary nerve, and work in coordination with other muscles of the shoulder girdle include pectoralis major and supraspinatus.

The axillary nerve is sometimes damaged during surgical procedures of the axilla, such as for breast cancer. It may also be injured by anterior dislocation of the head of the humerus.

Structures under deltoid

- Humerus
- Pectoralis minor
- Supraspinatus
- Infraspinatus
- Teres minor
- Subscapularis
- Pectoralis major
- Teres major
- Latissimus dorsi coracobrachialis
- Biceps brachii
- Triceps brachii
- Anterior circumflex humeral vessels
- Posterior circumflex humeral vessels
- Axillary nerve
- Shoulder joint
- Rotator cuff
- Coracoacromial ligament

== Function ==
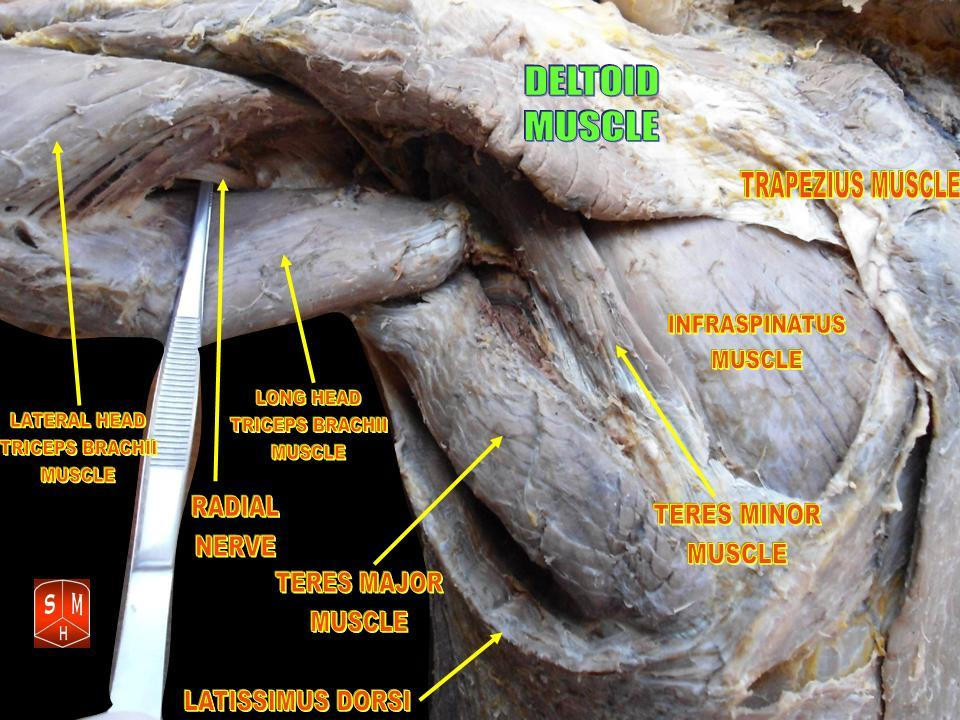
Deltoid muscle with superior limb in abduction

When all its fibers contract simultaneously, the deltoid is the prime mover of arm abduction along the frontal plane. The arm must be medially rotated for the deltoid to have maximum effect. This makes the deltoid an antagonist muscle of the pectoralis major and latissimus dorsi during arm adduction. The anterior fibers assist the pectoralis major to flex the shoulder. The anterior deltoid also works in tandem with the subscapularis, pecs and lats to internally (medially) rotate the humerus. The intermediate fibers perform basic shoulder abduction when the shoulder is internally rotated, and perform shoulder transverse abduction when the shoulder is externally rotated. They are not utilized significantly during strict transverse extension (shoulder internally rotated) such as in rowing movements, which use the posterior fibers. The posterior fibers assist the latissimus dorsi to extend the shoulder. Other transverse extensors, the infraspinatus and teres minor, also work in tandem with the posterior deltoid as external (lateral) rotators, antagonists to strong internal rotators like the pecs and lats.

An important function of the deltoid in humans is preventing the dislocation of the humeral head when a person carries heavy loads. The function of abduction also means that it would help keep carried objects a safer distance away from the thighs to avoid hitting them, as during a farmer's walk. It also ensures a precise and rapid movement of the glenohumeral joint needed for hand and arm manipulation. The intermediate fibers are in the most efficient position to perform this role, though like basic abduction movements (such as lateral raise) it is assisted by simultaneous co-contraction of anterior/posterior fibers.

The deltoid is responsible for elevating the arm in the scapular plane and its contraction in doing this also elevates the humeral head. To stop this compressing against the undersurface of the acromion the humeral head and injuring the supraspinatus tendon, there is a simultaneous contraction of some of the muscles of the rotator cuff: the infraspinatus and subscapularis primarily perform this role. In spite of this there may be still a 1–3 mm upward movement of the head of the humerus during the first 30° to 60° of arm elevation.

== Clinical significance ==
The most common abnormalities affecting the deltoid are tears, fatty atrophy, and enthesopathy. Deltoid muscle tears are unusual and frequently related to traumatic shoulder dislocation or massive rotator cuff tears. Muscle atrophy may result from various causes, including aging, disuse, denervation, muscular dystrophy, cachexia and iatrogenic injury. Deltoidal humeral enthesopathy is an exceedingly rare condition related to mechanical stress. Conversely, deltoideal acromial enthesopathy is likely a hallmark of seronegative spondylarthropathies and its detection should probably be followed by pertinent clinical and serological investigation.

The deltoid muscle is tested by asking the patient to abduct the arm against resistance applied with one hand, and feeling for the contracting muscle with the other hand.

Site of the intramuscular injection in deltoid: The intramuscular injections are commonly given in the lower half of the deltoid to avoid injury to the axillary nerve, which winds around the surgical neck of the humerus.

== Other animals ==
The deltoid is also found in members of the great ape family other than humans. The human deltoid is of similar proportionate size as the muscles of the rotator cuff in apes like the orangutan, which engage in brachiation and possess the muscle mass needed to support the body weight by the shoulders. In other apes, like the common chimpanzee, the deltoid is much larger than in humans, weighing an average of 383.3 gram compared to 191.9 gram in humans. This reflects the need to strengthen the shoulders, particularly the rotatory cuff, in knuckle walking apes for the purpose of supporting the entire body weight.

The deltoid muscle is a main component of both the bat and pterosaur wing musculature, but in crown-group birds it is strongly reduced, as they favour sternum attached muscles. Some Mesozoic flying theropods, however, had more developed deltoideus.
