= Great scapular notch =

Notch which serves to connect the supraspinous fossa and infraspinous fossa

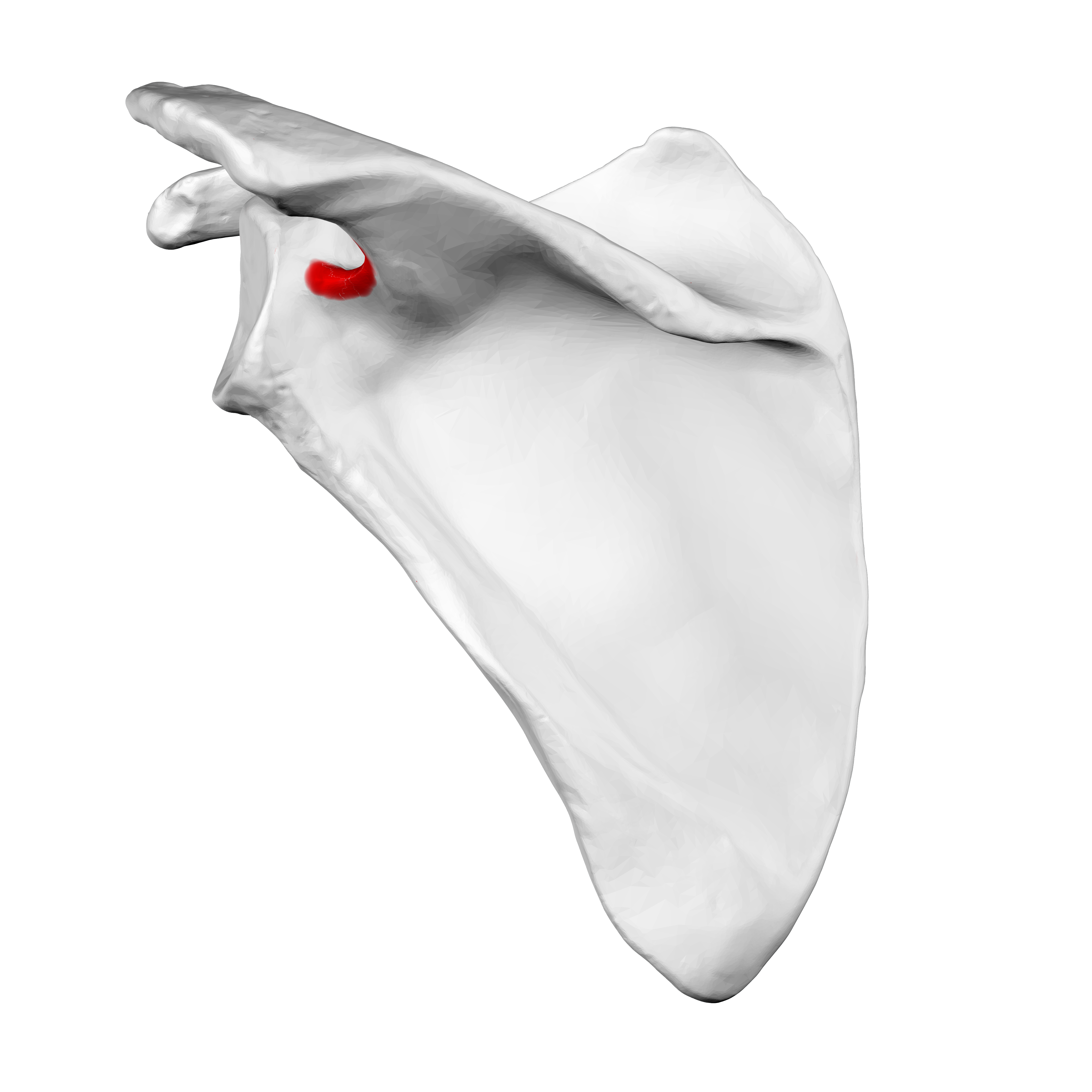
- Left scapula. Dorsal surface. Great scapular notch shown in red.

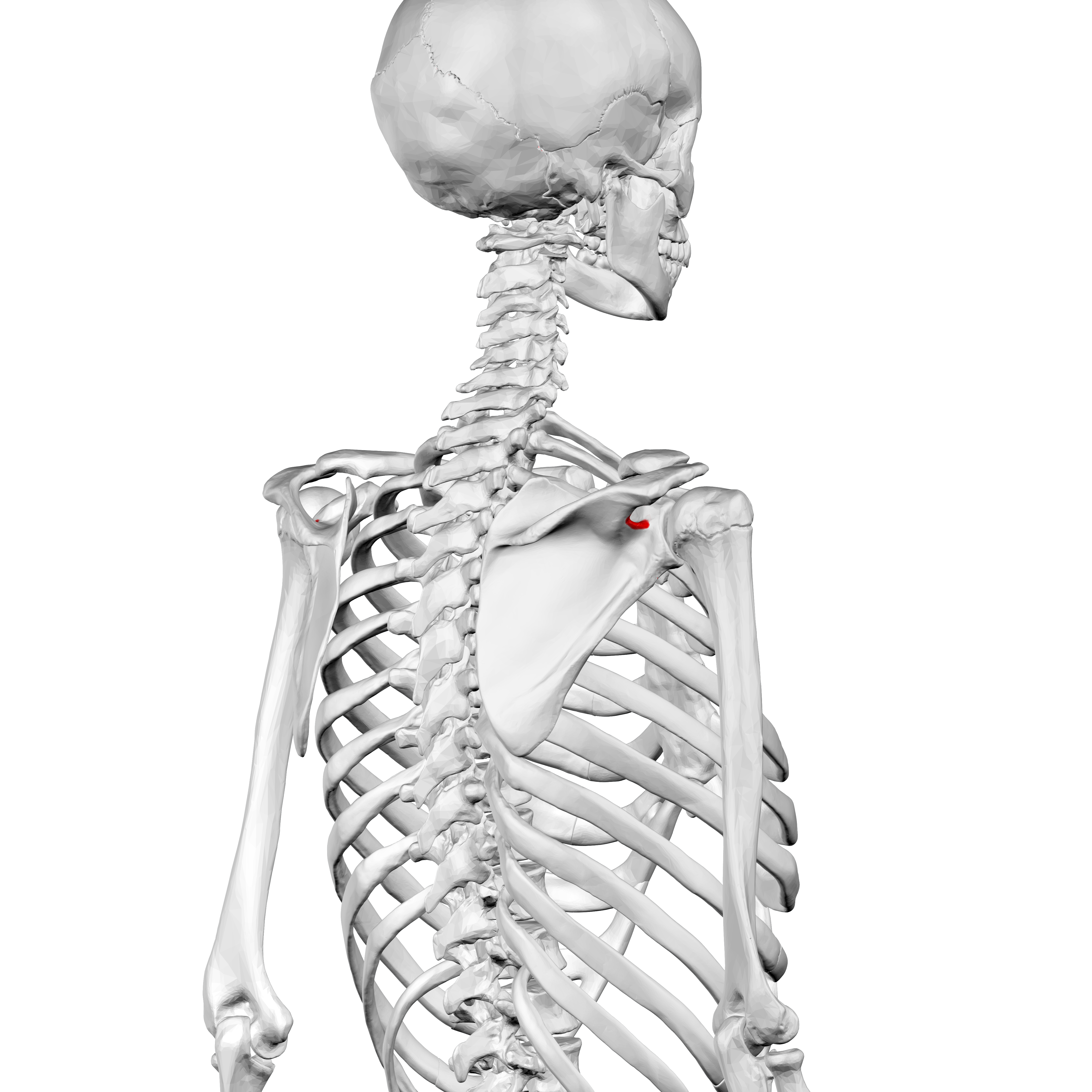
- Great scapular notch shown in red.

Identifiers
- TA2: 1149
- FMA: 23233

The great scapular notch (or spinoglenoid notch) is a notch which serves to connect the supraspinous fossa and infraspinous fossa. It lies immediately medial to the attachment of the acromion to the lateral angle of the scapular spine.

The suprascapular artery and suprascapular nerve pass around the great scapular notch anteroposteriorly.

Supraspinatus and infraspinatus are both supplied by the suprascapular nerve, which originates from the superior trunk of the brachial plexus (roots C5-C6).

== Additional images ==
Left scapula. Great scapular notch shown in red.

Animation. Great scapular notch shown in red.

== See also ==
- Suprascapular notch
- Suprascapular canal
