= Supraspinal =

Supraspinal means above the spine, and may refer to,

above the spinal cord and vertebral column:

- brain

or above the spine of scapula:

- supraspinatus muscle
- supraspinatous fascia
- supraspinatous fossa
- supraspinous ligament
