= Suprascapular canal =

Anatomical passage in the shoulder

Suprascapular Canal
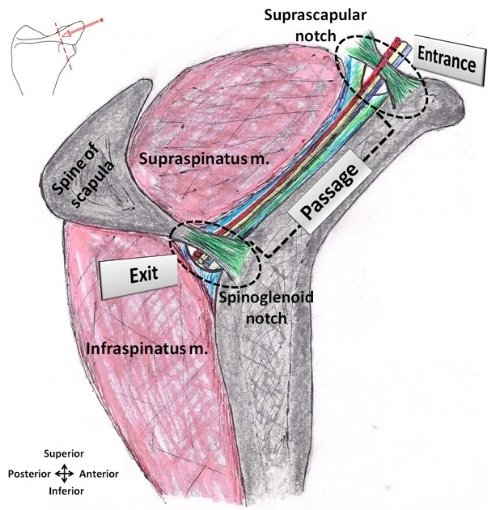
- Lateral view of a schematic representation of a sagittal section of the suprascapular canal

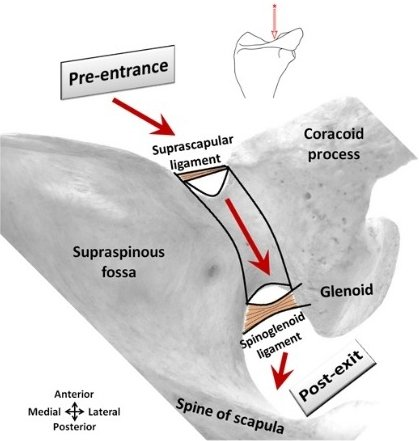
- Superior view of a schematic representation the suprascapular canal running on the scapula surface

Details

Identifiers
- Latin: 'canalis suprascapularis'

The suprascapular canal is an anatomical passage between two openings found on the upper dorsal aspect of the shoulder. It is found bilaterally running on superior-lateral aspect of the dorsal surface of the scapula underneath the supraspinatus muscle.

== Structure ==
The suprascapular canal is an osteofibrous canal situated in the spinoglenoid fossa conveying suprascapular nerve and vessels. Its passage covered by the supraspinatus fascia and connects between its entrance formed by the suprascapular notch (enclosed by the suprascapular ligament) and its exit formed by spinoglenoid notch (enclosed by the spinoglenoid ligament).

== Clinical significance ==
As the suprascapular nerve travels through the suprascapular canal narrow sites, it can potentially get entrapped leading to suprascapular nerve entrapment syndrome. The causes have different anatomical implications at each site. The mechanisms varies and range from anatomical variations to pathological formations as well as from nerve compression to dynamics and traction injuries. The most common causes potentially occur at the suprascapular canal entrance site due to suprascapular notch stenosis, and at its exit site due to synovial joint cystic formation (ganglion cyst) bulging through the spinoglenoid notch.
