= Transverse ligament of scapula =

Transverse ligament of scapula may refer to:

- Inferior transverse ligament of scapula
- Superior transverse scapular ligament
