= Spinatous fossa =

Spinatous fossa may refer to:

- Infraspinatous fossa
- Supraspinatous fossa
