= Transverse scapular ligament =

Transverse scapular ligament may refer to:

- Superior transverse scapular ligament
- Inferior transverse ligament of scapula
