= Infraspinous fascia =

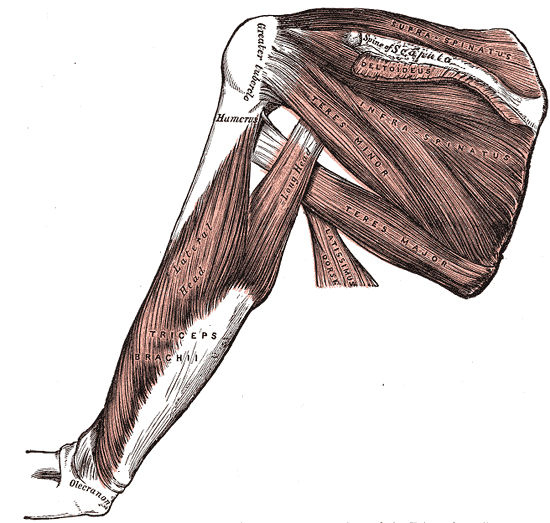
- Muscles on the dorsum of the scapula, and the triceps brachii. (Fascia not labeled, but infraspinatous visible near center.)

Details

Identifiers
- Latin: fascia infraspinata
- TA98: A04.6.02.009
- TA2: 2539
- FMA: 38530

The infraspinatous fascia is a dense fibrous membrane, covering the infraspinatous muscle and fixed to the circumference of the infraspinatous fossa; it affords attachment, by its deep surface, to some fibers of that muscle. It is intimately attached to the deltoid fascia along the over-lapping border of the deltoideus.
