= Soi ju =

Food in Thailand

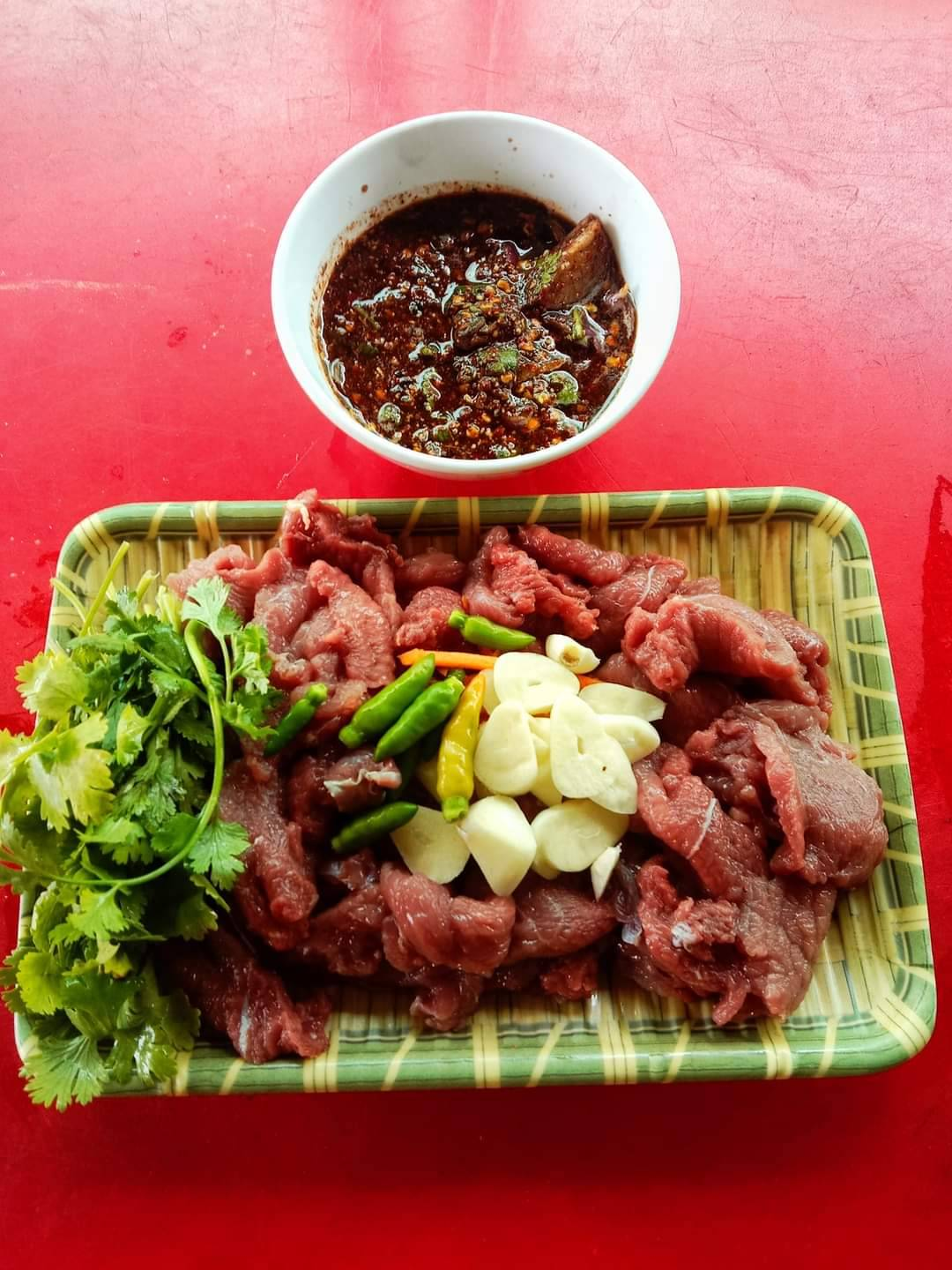
Soi Ju

Soi Ju (Thai: ซอยจุ๊) in Isan cuisine is the process of cutting raw meat and organs into bite-sized pieces without having to go through the process of cooking or seasoning. It is popular to eat with bitter Jaew dipping sauce. Varieties include: Tenderloin, Chuck, Liver and Sabai Nang.

== History ==
In the past, cows were raised in large numbers in the Isan region. They were large animals that could be shared among the entire village. Cows have thus become an important source of food for Isan people.

Because meat from these animals was shared and consumed immediately, it was often prepared fresh without cooking, leading to the development of dishes such as Soi Ju. The name “Soi Ju” comes from the Isan dialect, where “soi” means to slice and “ju” means to dip.

Over time, Soi Ju became a well-known dish in northeastern Thailand and remains part of local food culture today, although modern health concerns about consuming raw meat have also been raised.

== Preparation ==
The preparation of Soi Ju begins with the selection of very fresh raw meat or offal, typically obtained shortly after slaughter. Freshness is a critical factor, as the dish is consumed without cooking. The meat is commonly rinsed with clean water to remove blood and surface impurities, and it is handled with care throughout the process to minimize contamination.

The meat is then sliced into small, bite-sized pieces using a sharp knife. Cutting technique plays an important role in the final texture of the dish, as slicing against the grain can improve tenderness and make the meat easier to chew. In addition to muscle meat, various types of offal such as liver or tripe may be included depending on local preferences. These components are typically cleaned separately, often by soaking in cold water and trimming unwanted parts before being cut into pieces.

Unlike cooked meat dishes, Soi Ju does not involve heat treatment or seasoning during preparation. Instead, the focus is placed on maintaining the natural flavor and texture of the raw ingredients. Because of this, strict hygienic handling is essential at every stage, including the use of clean utensils, proper storage conditions, and minimizing exposure to contaminants. Failure to maintain these conditions may increase the risk of foodborne illness.

In traditional settings, preparation is often carried out immediately before consumption to preserve freshness. In modern contexts, additional precautions such as refrigeration and improved sanitation practices may be applied to reduce health risks while maintaining the original characteristics of the dish.

== Varieties ==
Local modifications may give the dish a unique taste. For example, some variations include roasted rice powder or additional spices to enhance flavor.

== Cultural significance ==
Soi Ju holds cultural significance within Isan society, reflecting local traditions, social practices, and regional identity. As a dish that emphasizes raw ingredients and freshness, it represents the close relationship between food, environment, and agricultural life in northeastern Thailand.

Traditionally, Soi Ju is associated with communal eating and is often prepared and consumed in group settings. It is commonly shared among family members, friends, or villagers, particularly during social gatherings, celebrations, and informal drinking occasions. This communal style of consumption reinforces social bonds and reflects the collective nature of Isan culture.

The dish is also connected to the historical lifestyle of rural communities, where resources were limited and food preparation methods were shaped by necessity. The practice of consuming freshly slaughtered meat without cooking highlights both practicality and a cultural appreciation for natural flavors.

In modern times, Soi Ju continues to serve as a symbol of regional identity, particularly among people from northeastern Thailand. It is sometimes viewed as a marker of authenticity and cultural heritage, even as it becomes more widely known in urban areas. However, changing attitudes toward food safety and health have influenced how the dish is perceived, leading to both continued appreciation and growing debate over its consumption.

Overall, Soi Ju illustrates how traditional food practices can embody cultural values, social relationships, and historical experiences within a community.

== Safety ==
The consumption of raw meat in dishes such as Soi Ju carries potential health risks due to possible contamination with bacteria and parasites. Raw meat may contain pathogens such as Salmonella enterica, Escherichia coli, and Staphylococcus aureus, which can cause foodborne illness.

Consuming raw or undercooked beef has also been associated with parasitic infections, including tapeworms. Symptoms of tapeworm infection may include abdominal pain, nausea, weight loss, diarrhea, and the passing of tapeworm segments in stool. In more severe cases, complications such as intestinal blockage or cyst infections affecting organs and the nervous system may occur.

Treatment for tapeworm infection usually involves antiparasitic medications such as praziquantel or albendazole, which are generally effective in eliminating the parasite.

Health authorities have issued warnings regarding the consumption of raw meat and related dishes. Even with proper preparation, the risk of infection cannot be completely eliminated, and vulnerable populations are advised to avoid consuming raw meat dishes such as Soi Ju.

== Environmental concerns ==
Environmental concerns related to Soi Ju primarily stem from its reliance on beef and buffalo, particularly in the context of cattle farming in northeastern Thailand. The tradition of cattle raising in the region has changed due to modernization and increased commercial demand, placing pressure on agricultural land and livestock resources.

Large-scale cattle farming can have significant environmental impacts, including deforestation, greenhouse gas emissions, and high water usage. The increasing popularity of raw meat dishes has also raised concerns about sustainable sourcing and the long-term environmental effects of increased meat production.

Balancing the preservation of traditional food practices with sustainable and responsible agricultural methods remains an ongoing challenge.
