= Spine of scapula =

Bony plate on the scapula

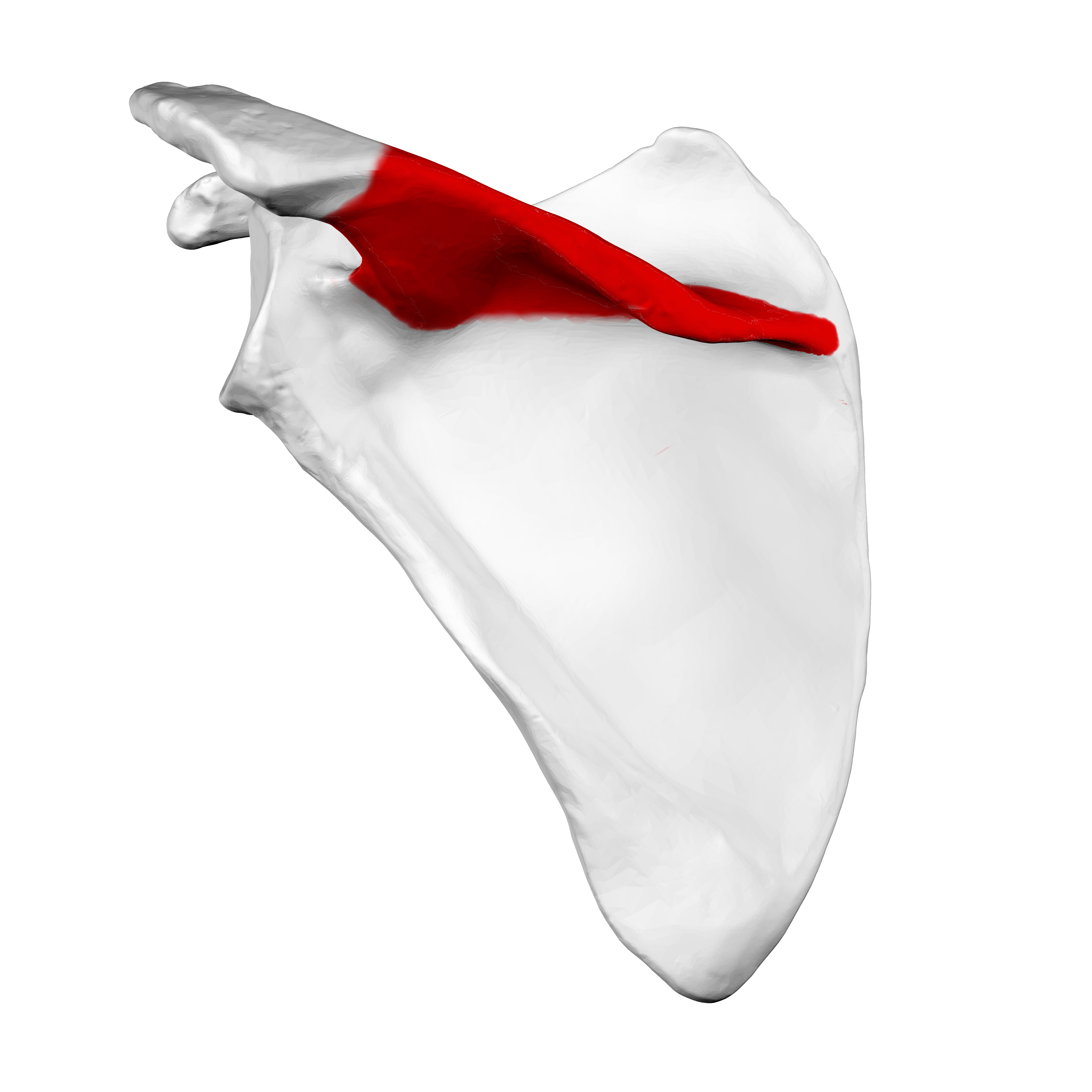
- Left scapula seen from behind (spine of scapula shown in red)

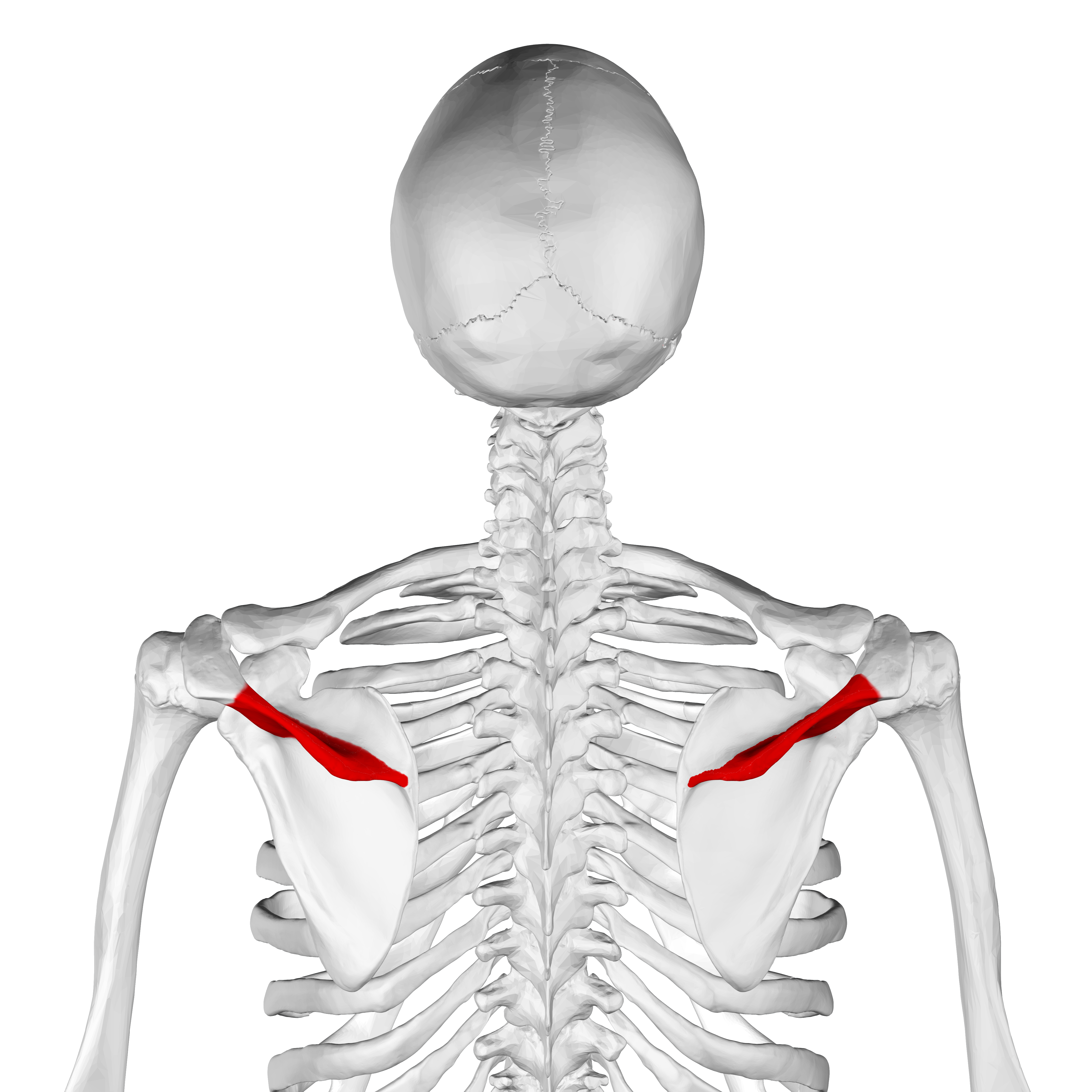
- Position of spine of scapula shown in red

Details

Identifiers
- Latin: spina scapulae
- TA98: A02.4.01.005
- TA2: 1147
- FMA: 13453

The spine of the scapula or scapular spine is a prominent plate of bone, which crosses obliquely the medial four-fifths of the scapula at its upper part, and separates the supra- from the infraspinatous fossa.

== Structure ==
It begins at the vertical (vertebral or medial) border by a smooth, triangular area over which the tendon of insertion of the lower part of the Trapezius glides. Gradually becoming more elevated, it ends in the acromion, which overhangs the shoulder-joint.

The spine is triangular, and flattened from above downward, its apex being directed toward the vertebral border.

=== Root ===
The root of the spine of the scapula is the most medial part of the scapular spine. It is termed "triangular area of the spine of scapula", based on its triangular shape giving it distinguishable visible shape on x-ray images. The root of the spine is on a level with the tip of the spinous process of the third thoracic vertebra.

Left scapula. Animation. Root of spine is shown in red.

Position of root of spine (shown in red.) Animation.

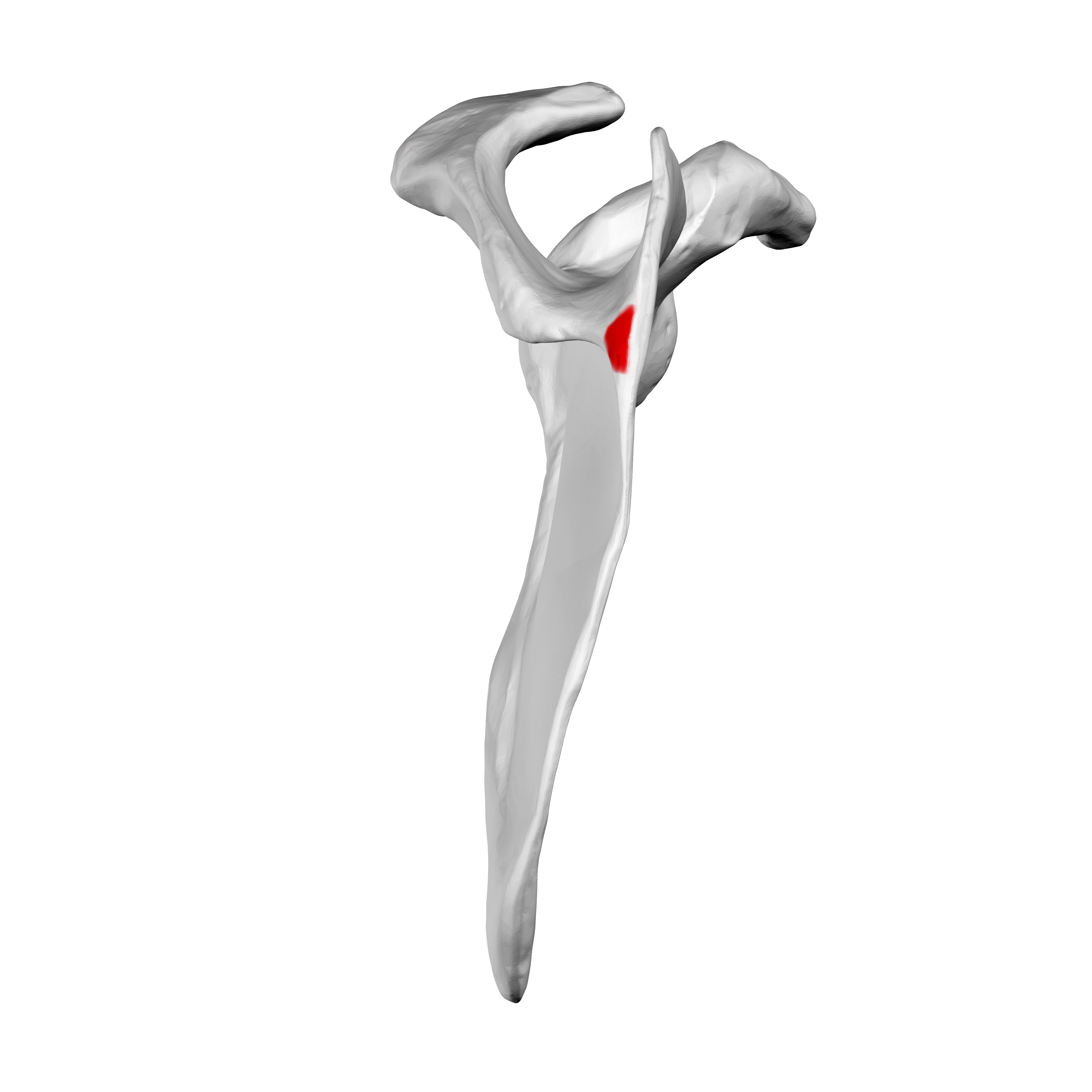
Medial view of left scapula. Root of spine shown in red.

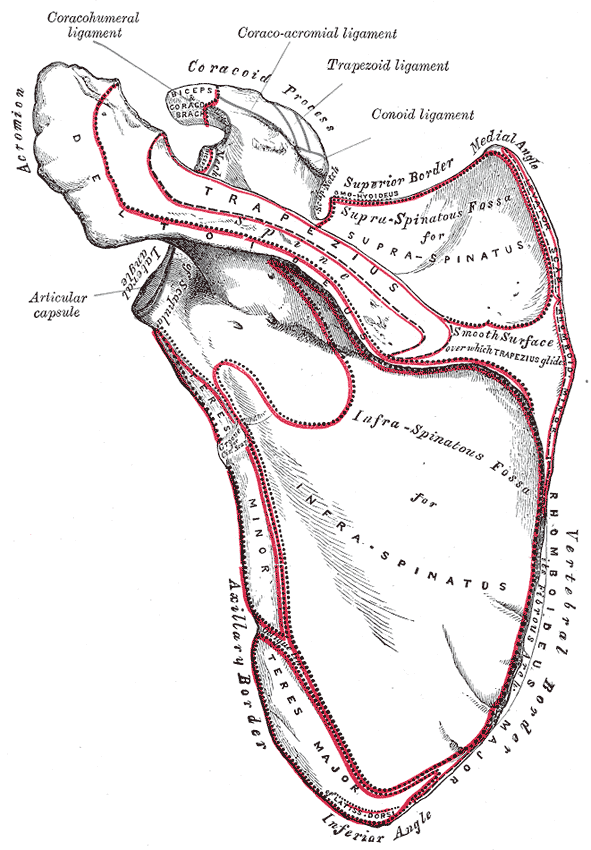
Posterior surface of scapula. Root of spine is not labeled. But visible at center right.

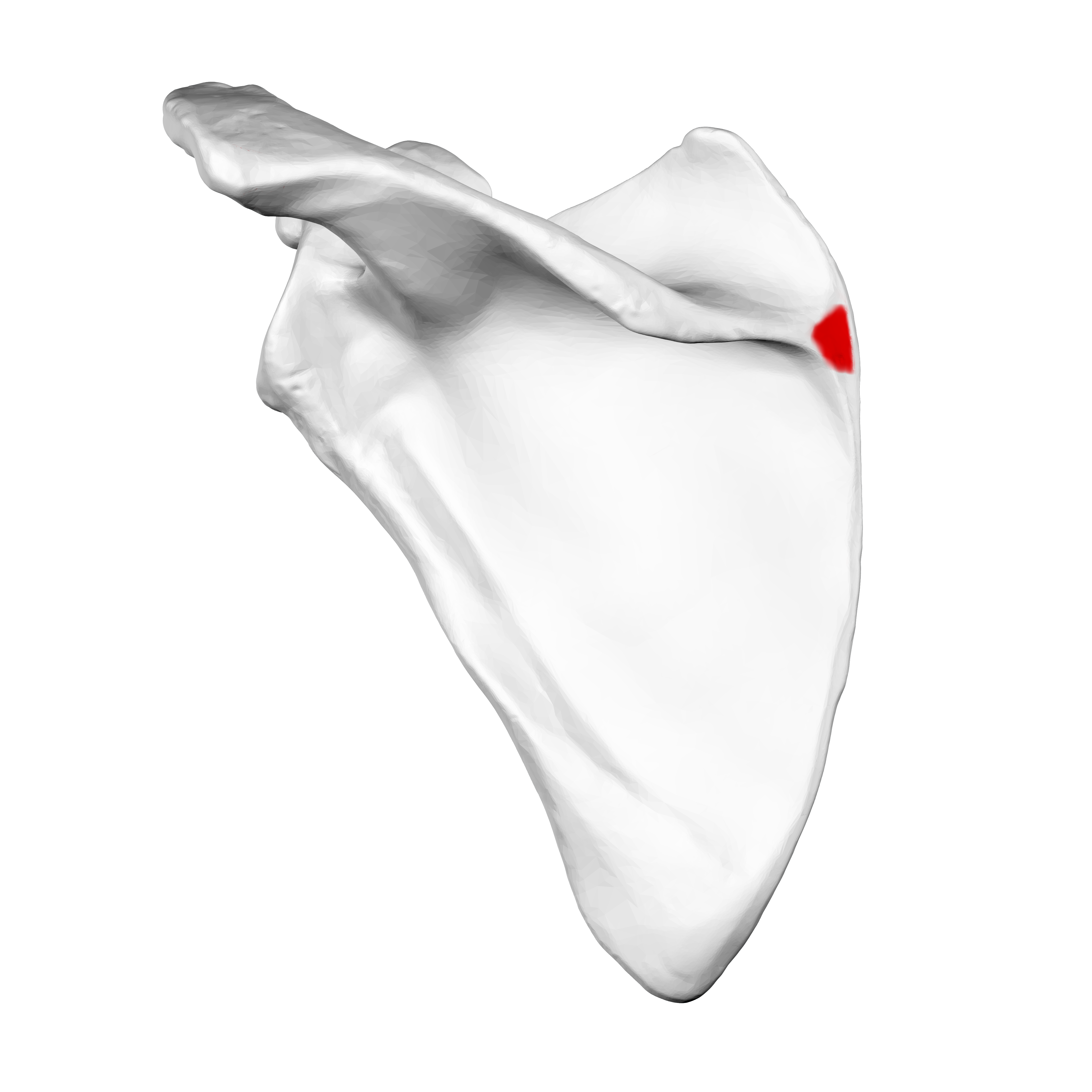
Left scapula. Posterior view. Root of spine shown in red.

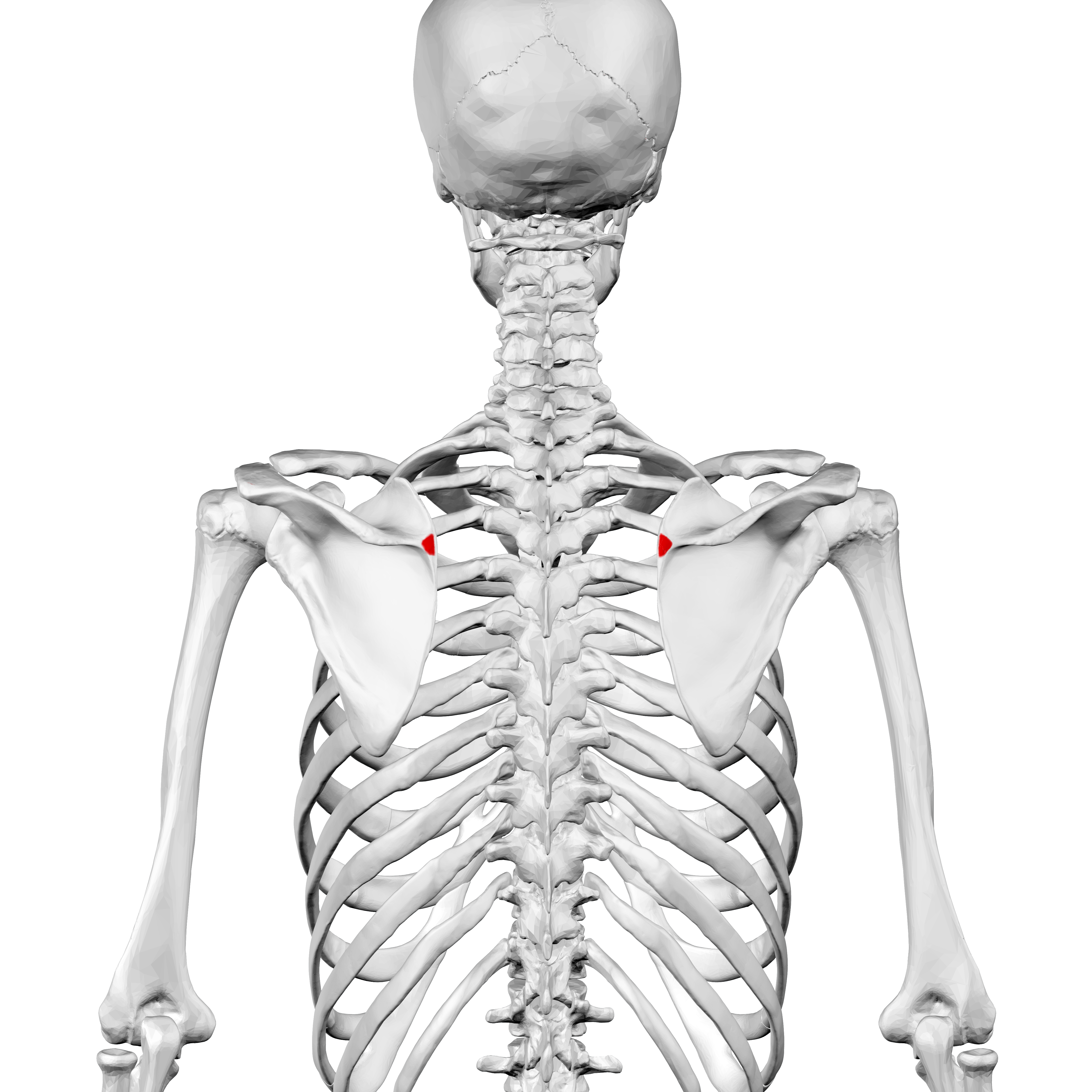
Posterior view. Root of spine shown in red.

== Function ==
It presents two surfaces and three borders.

- Its superior surface is concave; it assists in forming the supraspinatous fossa, and gives origin to part of the supraspinatus.
- Its inferior surface forms part of the infraspinatous fossa, gives origin to a portion of the infraspinatus, and presents near its center the orifice of a nutrient canal.

Of the three borders, the anterior is attached to the dorsal surface of the bone; the posterior, or crest of the spine, is broad, and presents two lips and an intervening rough interval.

- The trapezius is attached to the superior lip, and a rough tubercle is generally seen on that portion of the spine which receives the tendon of insertion of the lower part of this muscle.
- The deltoideus is attached to the whole length of the inferior lip.
- The interval between the lips is subcutaneous and partly covered by the tendinous fibers of these muscles.

The lateral border, or base, the shortest of the three, is slightly concave; its edge, thick and round, is continuous above with the under surface of the acromion, below with the neck of the scapula. It forms the medial boundary of the great scapular notch, which serves to connect the supra- and infraspinatous fossae.

== Additional images ==
Left scapula seen from behind (spine shown in red).

Position of spine (shown in red). Animation.

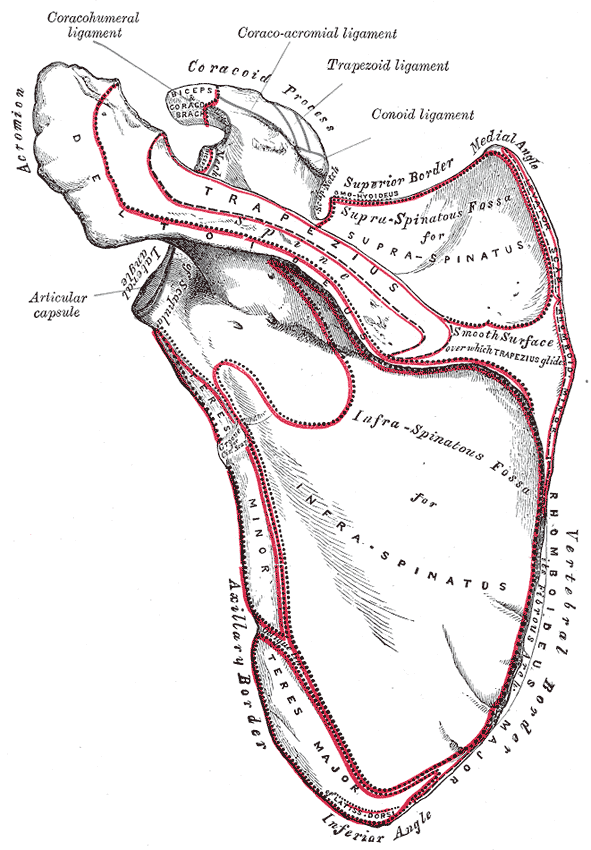
Left scapula seen from behind (spine labeled at center top, projecting "out").

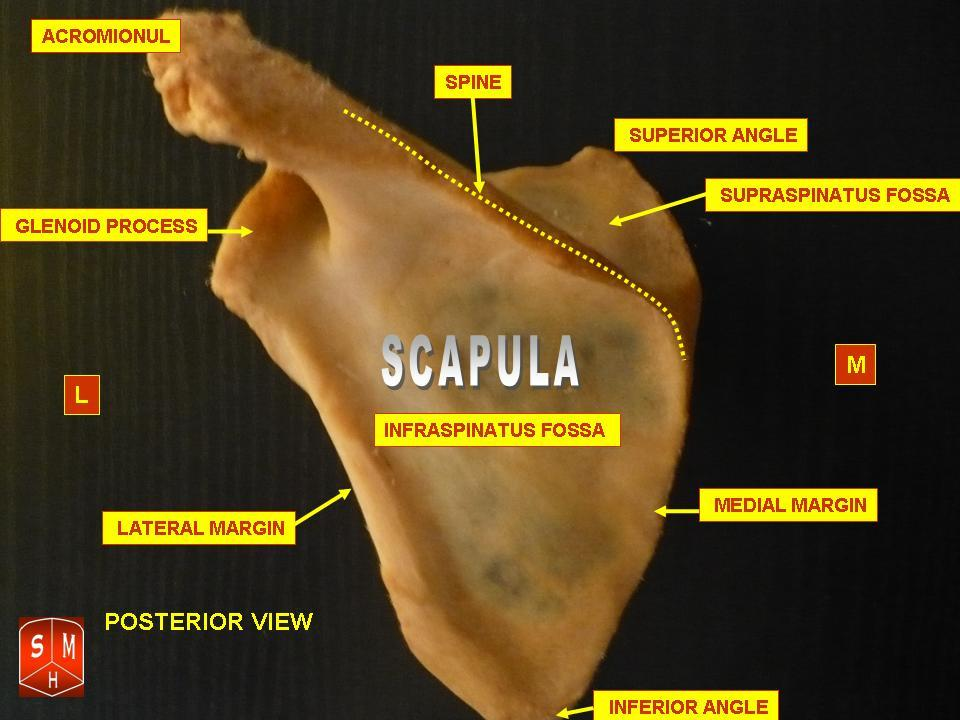
Left scapula seen from behind (spine labeled at center top).

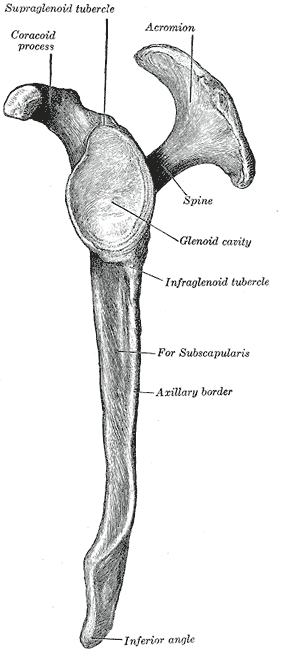
Left scapula. lateral view (spine labeled at upper right).

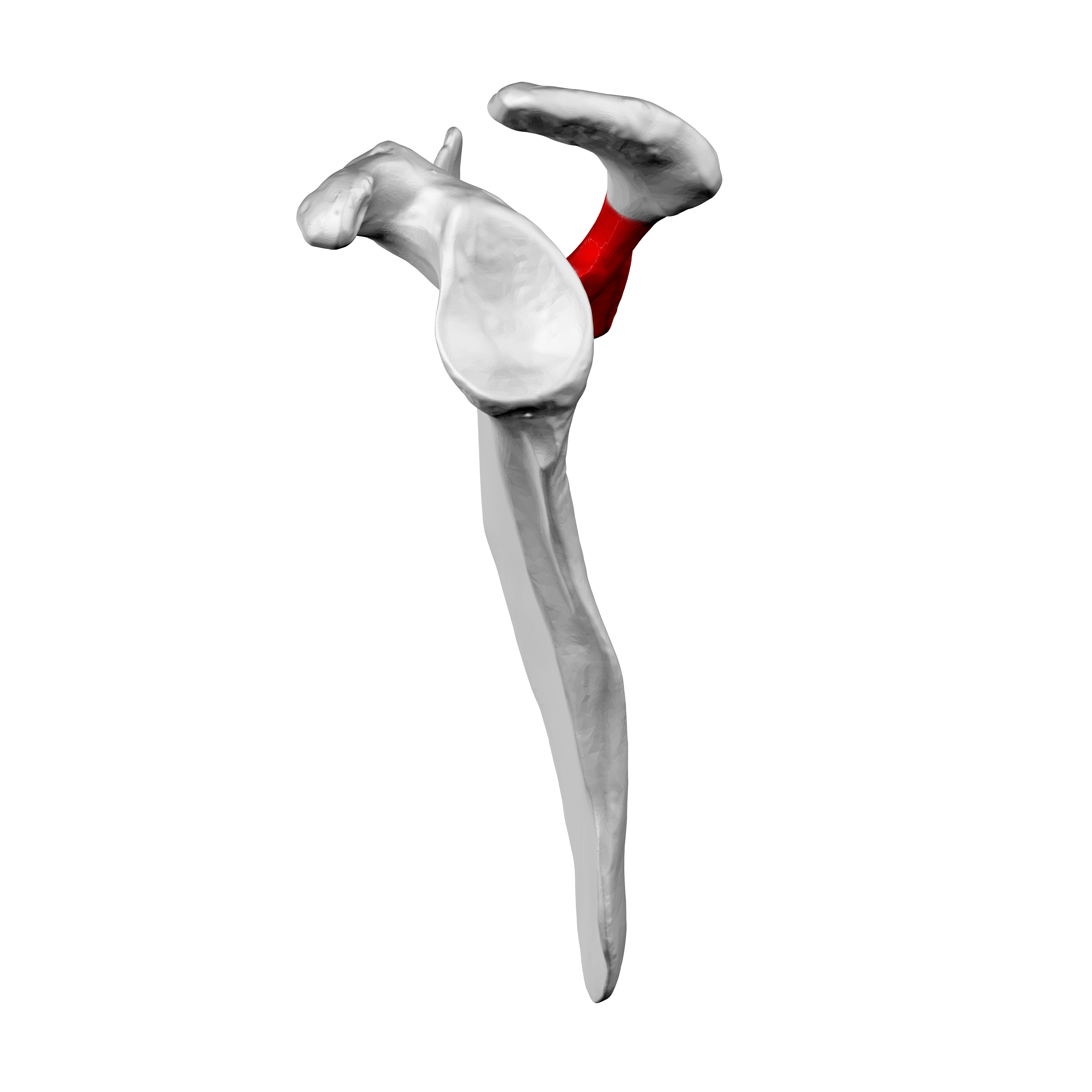
Left scapula. Lateral view (spine shown in red)

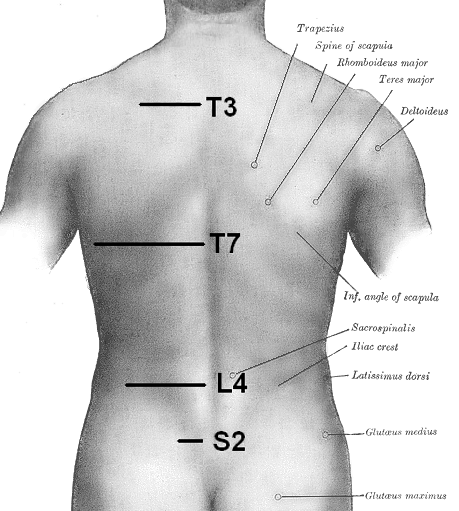
Surface anatomy of back

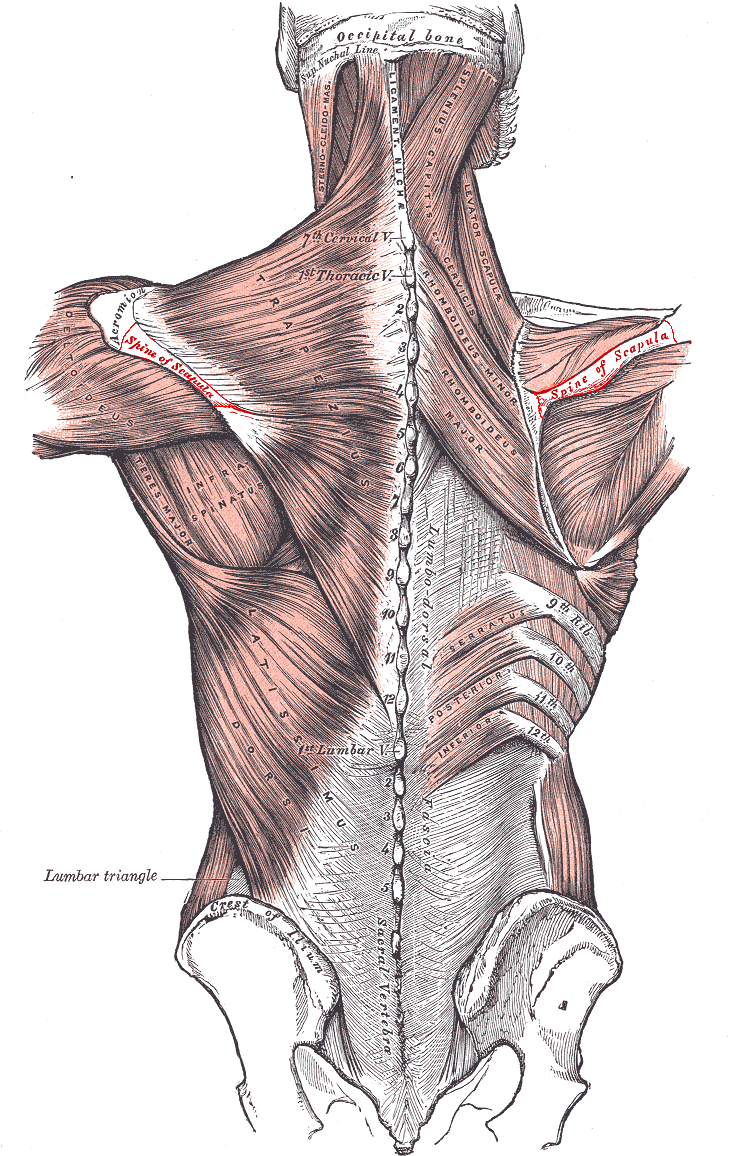
Spine of scapula labeled in red, showing muscles attached to it

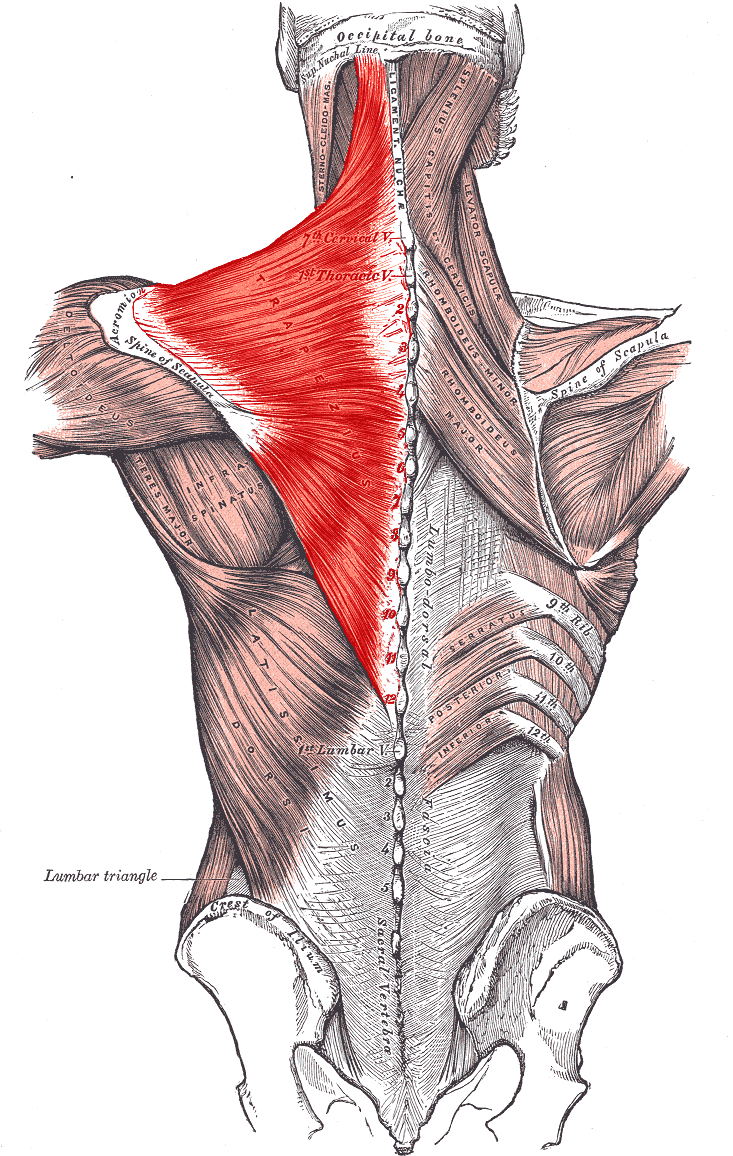
Trapezius muscle

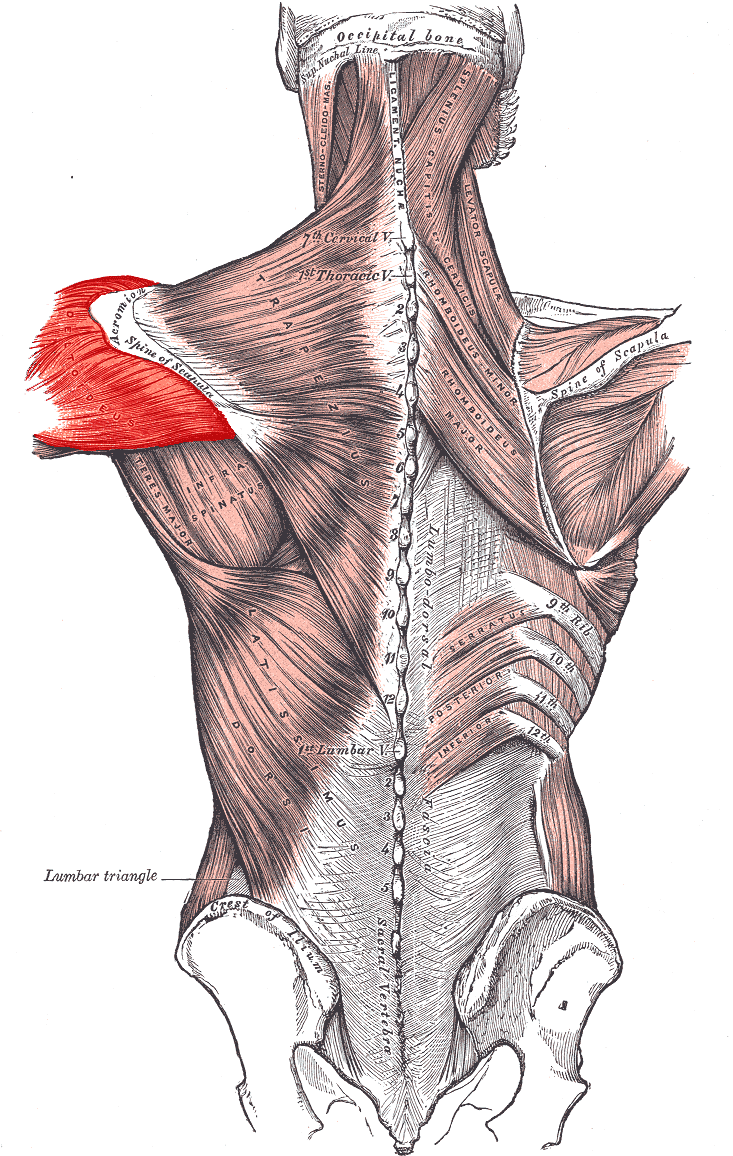
Deltoid muscle
