= Suprascapular nerve =

Mixed nerve of the upper limb

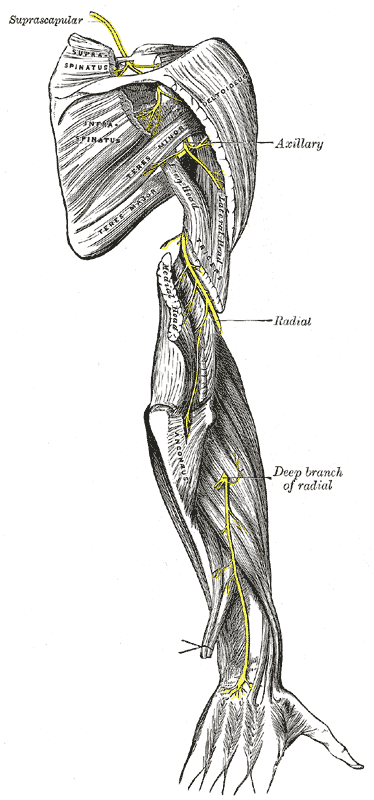
- The suprascapular, axillary, and radial nerves. (Suprascapular labeled at upper left.)

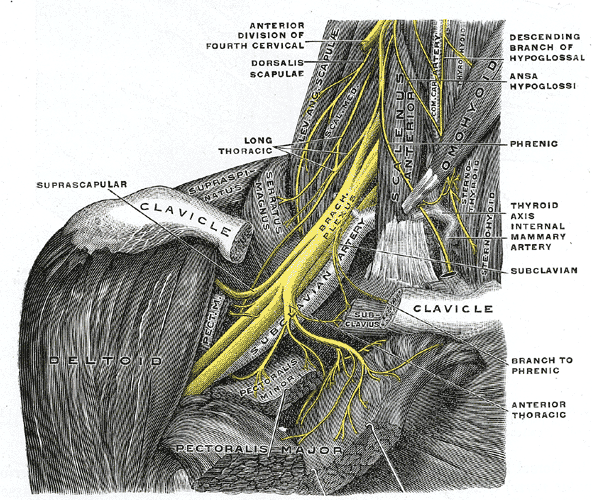
- The right brachial plexus with its short branches, viewed from in front. (Suprascapular labeled at upper left.)

Details
- From: Upper trunk (C5–C6) of brachial plexus
- Innervates: Supraspinatus, infraspinatus

Identifiers
- Latin: nervus suprascapularis
- TA98: A14.2.03.014
- TA2: 6411
- FMA: 37025

The suprascapular nerve is a mixed (sensory and motor) nerve that branches from the upper trunk of the brachial plexus. It is derived from the ventral rami of cervical nerves C5-C6. It provides motor innervation to the supraspinatus muscle, and the infraspinatus muscle.

== Structure ==
=== Origin ===
The suprascapular nerve arises from the upper trunk of the brachial plexus which is formed by the union of the ventral rami of the cervical nerves C5-C6.

=== Course and relations ===
After branching from the upper trunk, the nerve passes across the posterior triangle of the neck parallel to the inferior belly of the omohyoid muscle and deep to the trapezius muscle. It then runs along the superior border of the scapula through the suprascapular canal, in which it enters via the suprascapular notch inferior to the superior transverse scapular ligament and enters the supraspinous fossa. It then passes beneath the supraspinatus and curves around the lateral border of the spine of the scapula through spinogleniod notch to the infraspinous fossa.

== Function ==
The suprascapular nerve is a mixed peripheral nerve containing motor and sensory components.

=== Motor innervation ===
- Supraspinatus muscle
- Infraspinatus muscle (through the spinoglenoid notch)

=== Sensory innervation ===
- Acromioclavicular joint
- Glenohumeral joint (shoulder joint)

In the supraspinous fossa it gives off two branches to the supraspinatus muscle and in the infraspinous fossa it gives off two branches to the infraspinatus muscle.

== Clinical significance ==
- Suprascapular paralysis, causing back pain, problems with abduction and external rotation of the humerus, and wasting away of supraspinatus and infraspinatus. Supraspinatus muscle helps in 0°-15° arm abduction. And Infraspinatus helps in lateral rotation (external rotation) of humerus.
- Suprascapular nerve entrapment syndrome, causing shoulder pain and localized muscular atrophy of the supraspinatus and infraspinatus muscles. This can potentially develop due to suprascapular nerve being entrapped and compressed within the suprascapular canal potential anatomical entrapment sites.

== Additional images ==
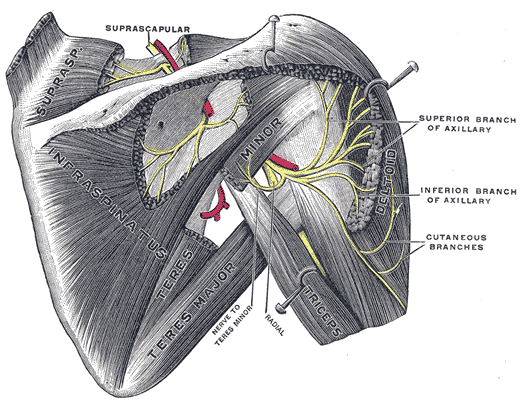
Suprascapular and axillary nerves of right side, seen from behind.

Brachial plexus with courses of spinal nerves shown
