= Blade steak =

Cut of beef

Top blade steak
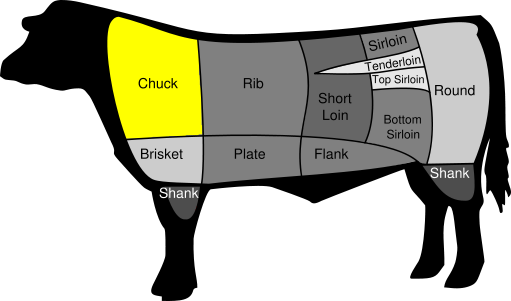
- Beef Cuts
- Type: Chuck cut of beef

The beef top blade steak (also known as the chicken steak) is a cut from the chuck section of a steer or heifer.

== Description ==
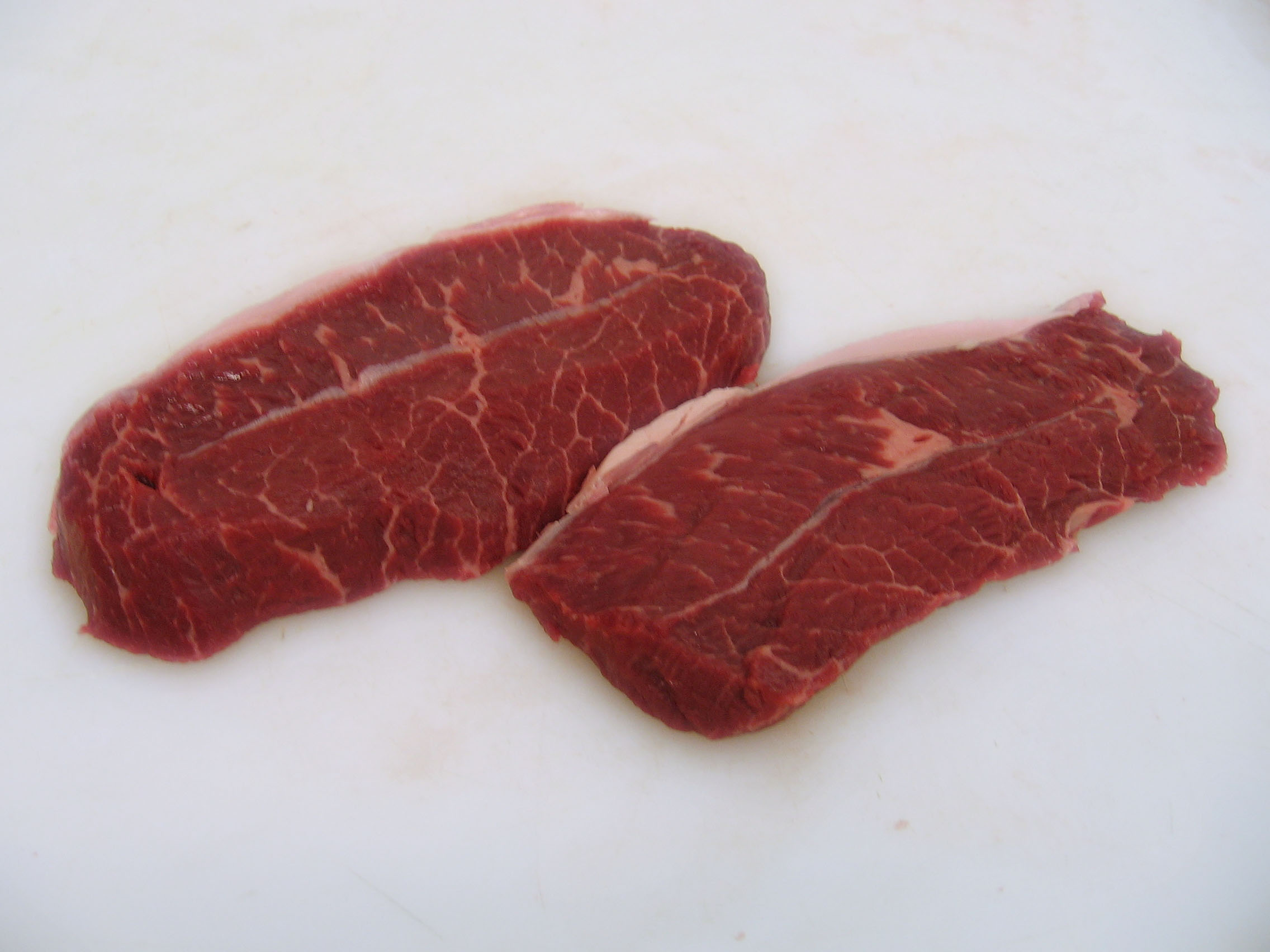
Raw blade steak, showing the gristly fascia membrane down the middle

The steaks are cross-cut from the top blade subprimal, the infraspinatus. The same muscle cut with the grain gives flat iron steaks, which do not have the connective tissue (fascia) that runs down the middle of the blade steak.

== See also ==
- Beef clod
- Flat iron steak
