= Flat iron steak =

Cut of steak

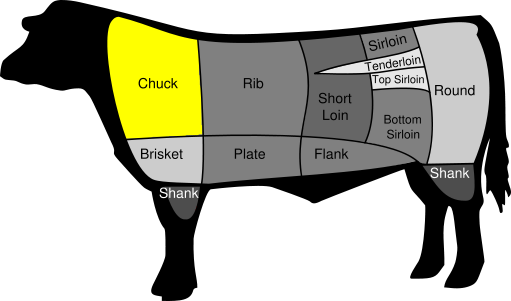
- Beef Cuts
- Alternative names: top blade roast, shoulder top blade roast, top boneless chuck, petite steak, butler steak, lifter steak, book steak, chuck clod, lifter roast, and triangle roast
- Type: Chuck steak

Flat iron steak (US), butlers' steak (UK), feather steak (UK) or oyster blade steak (Australia and New Zealand) is a cut of steak cut with the grain from the chuck, or shoulder of the animal.

== Origin ==
The origin of flat iron steak began with the National Cattlemen's Beef Association's Beef Checkoff program in 1998, as an effort to reduce waste and promote beef, which was selling at a 25-50% discount in 1996 as compared to 1993. Dwain Johnson at the University of Florida's Institute of Food and Agricultural Sciences and Chris Calkins at the University of Nebraska–Lincoln were given grants to help mitigate these issues. Calkins and Johnson focused on the cheaper parts of beef, the chuck and the round, to see if a desirable steak could be produced from either of these. The research teams at both schools found that the top blade of the chuck, specifically the infraspinatus muscle, contained tender meat, but there was a large seam of tough connective tissue down the middle that had to be removed. Removing this tissue was seen to be too much effort for value for meat processors to bother with, as it wasn't felt that enough meat would be recovered to make it worth the while. Calkins and Johnson found that, while cutting out the tissue did result in a thin cut of beef, it plumped up well when cooked. The NCBA started promoting flat iron steak in 2001 and in the early 2000s Applebee's put it on the menu, and the Kroger grocery store chain started carrying the cut in 2006. In 2012, sales of flat iron steak brought in approximately $80 million USD.

The name flat iron steak comes from the cut's resemblance to an old-fashioned flat iron.

== The cut ==
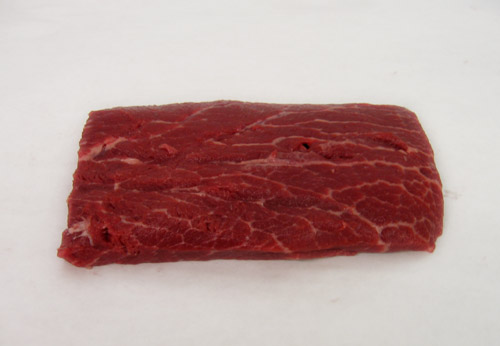
Flat iron steak

This cut of steak is from the shoulder of a bovine animal. It is located adjacent to the heart of the shoulder clod, under the seven or paddle bone (shoulder blade or scapula). The steak encompasses the infraspinatus muscles of beef, and one may see this displayed in some butcher shops and meat markets as a top blade roast or informally called a "patio steak". Anatomically, the muscle forms the dorsal part of the rotator cuff of the steer. This cut is anatomically distinct from the shoulder tender, which lies directly below it and is the teres major.

Steaks that are cross cut from this muscle are called top blade steaks, or chicken steaks. To make it more marketable, the cut which makes up this steak, which has the fascia dividing the infraspinatus within it, has increasingly been cut as two flatter steaks, with the tough fascia removed. This method of breaking down the larger cut was creation of the flat iron steak as we know it today. As a whole cut of meat, the top blade usually weighs around two to three pounds; it usually yields four steaks between eight and 12 ounces each. Flat iron steaks usually have a "significant" amount of marbling. In the North American Meat Processor (NAMP) meat buyers guide, it is item #1114D Beef Shoulder, Top Blade Steak.
