= Inferior transverse ligament of scapula =

Ligament of the shoulder blade

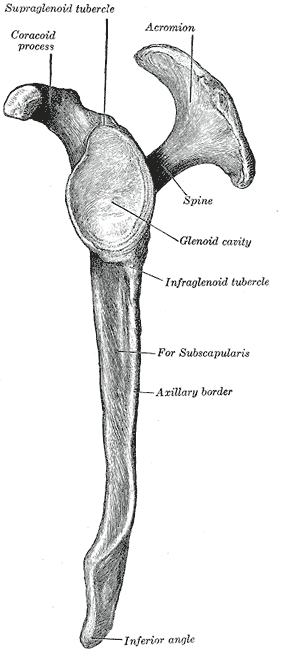
- Left scapula. Lateral view. (Ligament not visible, but sites of attachments of the ligament can be seen.)

Details
- From: Spine of scapula
- To: Glenoid cavity

Identifiers
- Latin: ligamentum transversum scapulae inferius
- TA98: A03.5.01.004
- TA2: 1742
- FMA: 25978

The inferior transverse ligament (spinoglenoid ligament) is a weak membranous band, situated behind the neck of the scapula and stretching from the lateral border of the spine to the margin of the glenoid cavity.

It forms an arch under which the suprascapular vessels and suprascapular nerve enter the infraspinatous fossa.
