= Suprascapular notch =

Groove in the superior border of the scapula, for the suprascapular nerve to pass through

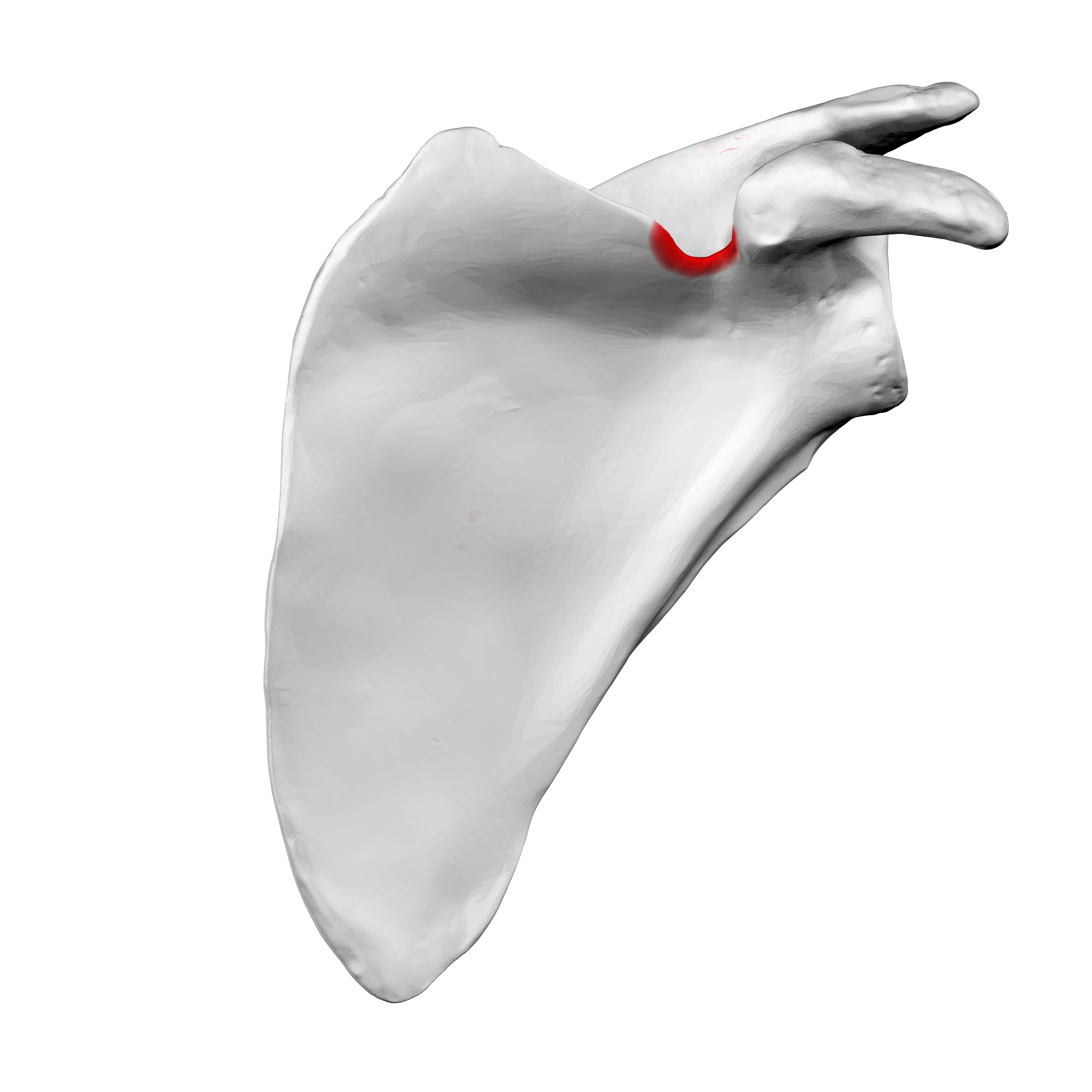
- Costal surface of left scapula. Suprascapular notch shown in red.

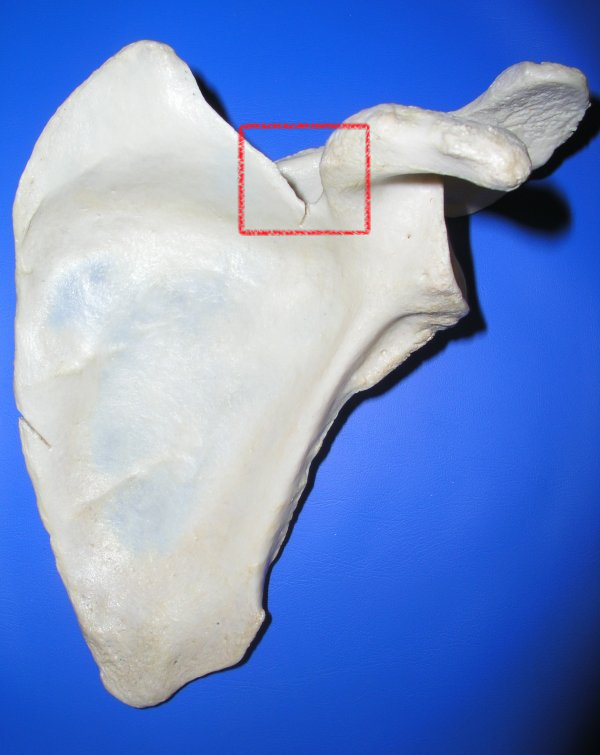
- Costal surface of left scapula. Suprascapular notch visible in the red square.

Details

Identifiers
- Latin: incisura scapulae
- TA98: A02.4.01.015
- TA2: 1158
- FMA: 23236

The suprascapular notch (or scapular notch) is a notch in the superior border of the scapula, just medial to the base of the coracoid process. It is converted into the suprascapular canal by the suprascapular ligament.

== Structure ==
This notch is converted into a foramen by the suprascapular ligament, and serves for the passage of the suprascapular nerve. The suprascapular vessels vary in number as well as in their course as they run at the suprascapular notch site. The suprascapular artery pass above the suprascapular ligament in most cases. The suprascapular vein may pass through the suprascapular notch or it may instead pass superior to the suprascapular ligament.

== Types ==
Two main classification systems exist; others are modified approaches of the same principle.

=== Typing based on subjective observation of the suprascapular notch shape. ===
Introduced by Hrdicka 1942 and modified by Rengachary et al. 1979 There are six basic types of scapular notch:

- Type I: Notch is absent. The superior border forms a wide depression from the medial angle to the coracoid process.
- Type II: Notch is a blunted V-shape occupying the middle third of the superior border.
- Type III: Notch is U-shaped with nearly parallel margins.
- Type IV: Notch is V-shaped and very small. A shallow groove is frequently formed for the suprascapular nerve adjacent to the notch.
- Type V: Notch is minimal and U-shaped with a partially ossified ligament.
- Type VI: Notch is a foramen as the ligament is completely ossified.

=== Typing based on parametric measurements of depth to upper width ratio of the suprascapular notch ===
Introduced by Natsis et al. 2007 and modified by Polguj et al. 2011 There are five basic types of scapular notch:

- Type I: Depth larger than upper width.
- Type II: Depth equal to upper width.
- Type III: Depth is smaller than upper width.
- Type IV: Notch is a foramen.
- Type V: Discrete notch.

The second method of suprascapular notch typing yields more practical approach in clinical diagnosis of the suprascapular nerve entrapment.

== Clinical significance ==
As the suprascapular nerve passes through the suprascapular notch, it is a common site of entrapment for the nerve.

Suprascapular notch stenosis is a narrowing of the notch internal space that can potentially compress the suprascapular nerve leading to suprascapular nerve entrapment. Al-Redouan et al. 2020 predicted the morphological pattern of the suprascapular notch stenosis revealing higher incidence in the discrete notch (Type V according to the parametric measurements typing system). There are two main suprascapular stenosis patterns:

- Vertical stenosis. Treated surgically by cutting the suprascapular ligament (ligamentectomy).
- Horizontal stenosis. Treated surgically by trimming the notch borders (osteoplasty).

The suprascapular nerve predictably passes through the suprascapular notch, so it is a good place for a local nerve block of the entire nerve.

== Additional images ==
Left scapula. Suprascapular notch shown in red.

Animation. Suprascapular notch shown in red.

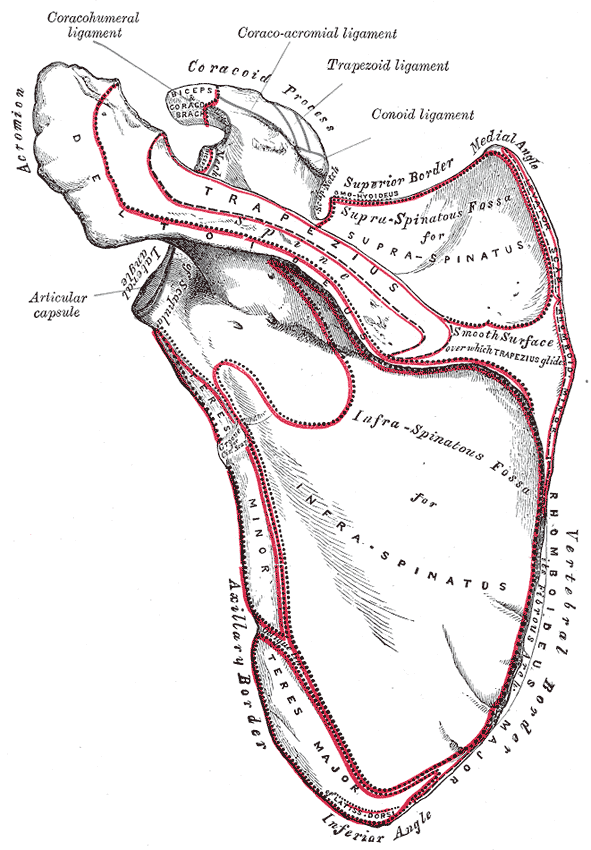
Left scapula. Dorsal surface. (Sup. notch visible at top center.)

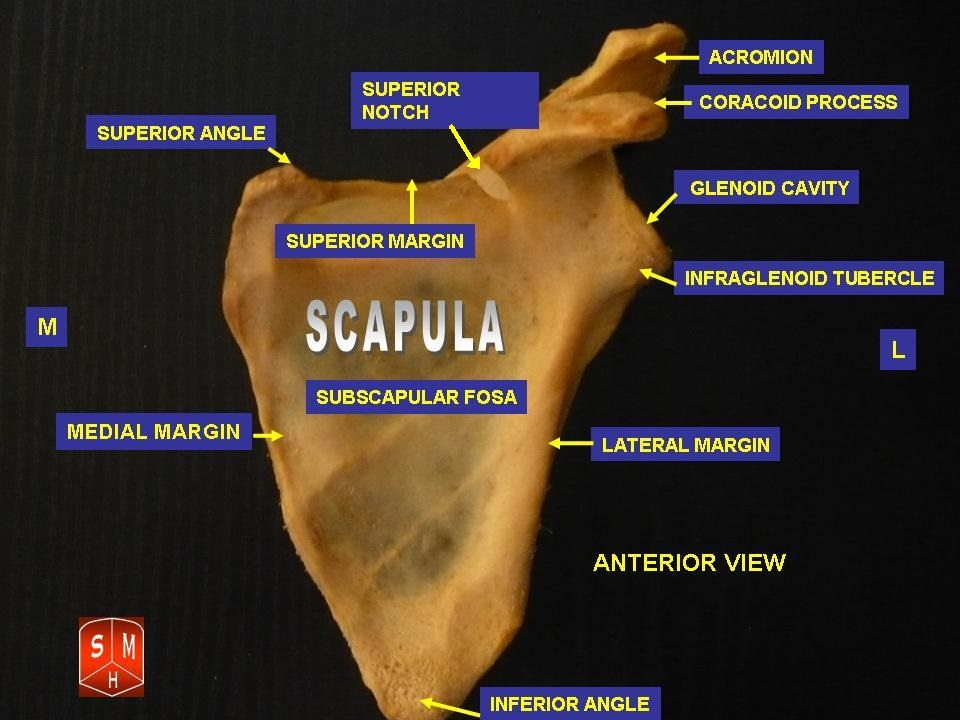
Costal surface of left scapula. Suprascapular notch labeled at top center.

== See also ==
- Great scapular notch
- Suprascapular canal
