= Supraspinous fascia =

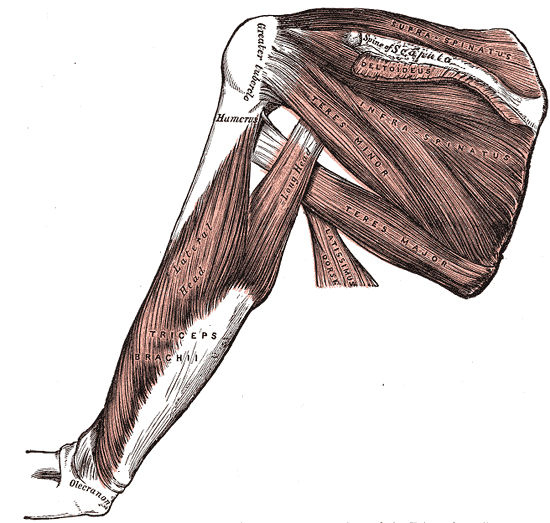
- Muscles on the dorsum of the scapula, and the triceps brachii. (Fascia not labeled, but supraspinatus visible at top right.)

Details

Identifiers
- Latin: fascia supraspinata
- TA98: A04.6.02.007
- TA2: 2538
- FMA: 38353

The supraspinous fascia completes the osseofibrous case in which the supraspinatus muscle is contained; it affords attachment, by its deep surface, to some of the fibers of the muscle.

It is thick medially, but thinner laterally under the coracoacromial ligament.
