= Beef clod =

Cut of beef

Beef shoulder clod
- Beef cuts

The beef clod or shoulder clod is one of the least expensive cuts of beef and is taken from the shoulder (chuck) region of the animal. Beef clod is a large muscle system, with some fat that covers the muscles. The clod's composition is mainly three muscles: the shoulder tender, the top blade and the clod heart and is one of two chuck subprimal cuts. It is often divided into its three separate muscle cuts for retail sale.

Beef clod, along with beef brisket, is historically the foundation of Central Texas-style barbecue, as epitomized by Kreuz Market in Lockhart, Texas, where the clod has been prepared since 1900 by long, slow smoking. Beef clod may also be prepared with moist heat or braising.

== Shoulder tender ==
A shoulder tender, also called beef shoulder petite tender, beef shoulder tender petite roast, bistro filet, or teres major steak, is a US cut of beef of the teres major muscle from the blade of the shoulder (chuck). It is one of the tenderest beef muscles and is said to be "white-tablecloth quality", being a similar quality to filet mignon, but cheaper. It is rarely used, as it requires skill to extract. It is known as petite tender medallion, petite tender or tender medallions if sliced into medallions (after being roasted or grilled whole). It is shaped like a pork tenderloin, and weighs 8 to 10 ounces (230 to 280 g).

The flat iron steak lies above it, and is distinct from this steak, as it is formed from different muscles: teres minor and infraspinatus.

== See also ==
- Blade steak
- Chuck steak
- Cuts of Beef
