= Supraspinous fossa =

Part of the shoulderblade

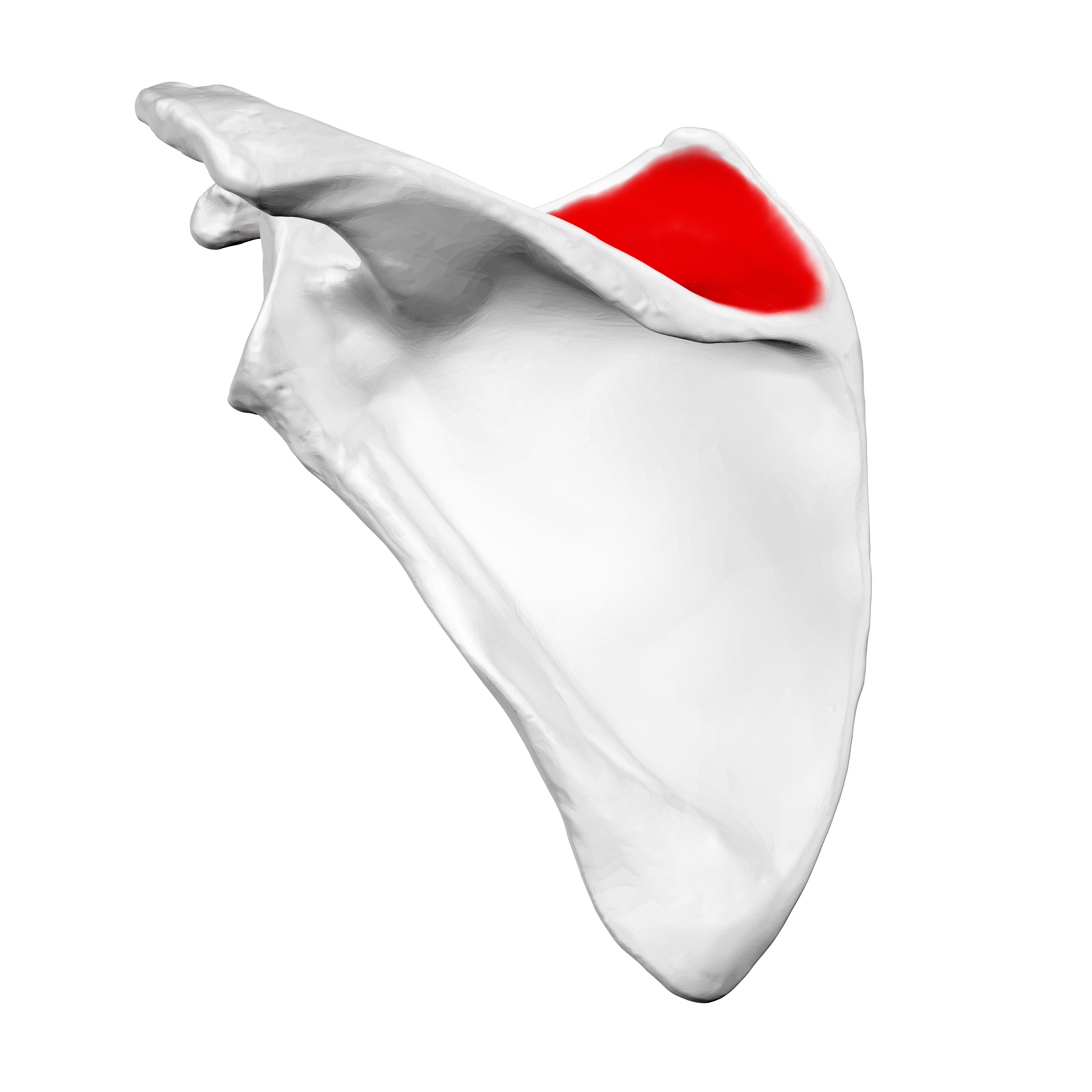
- Left scapula. Dorsal surface. Supraspinatous fossa shown in red.

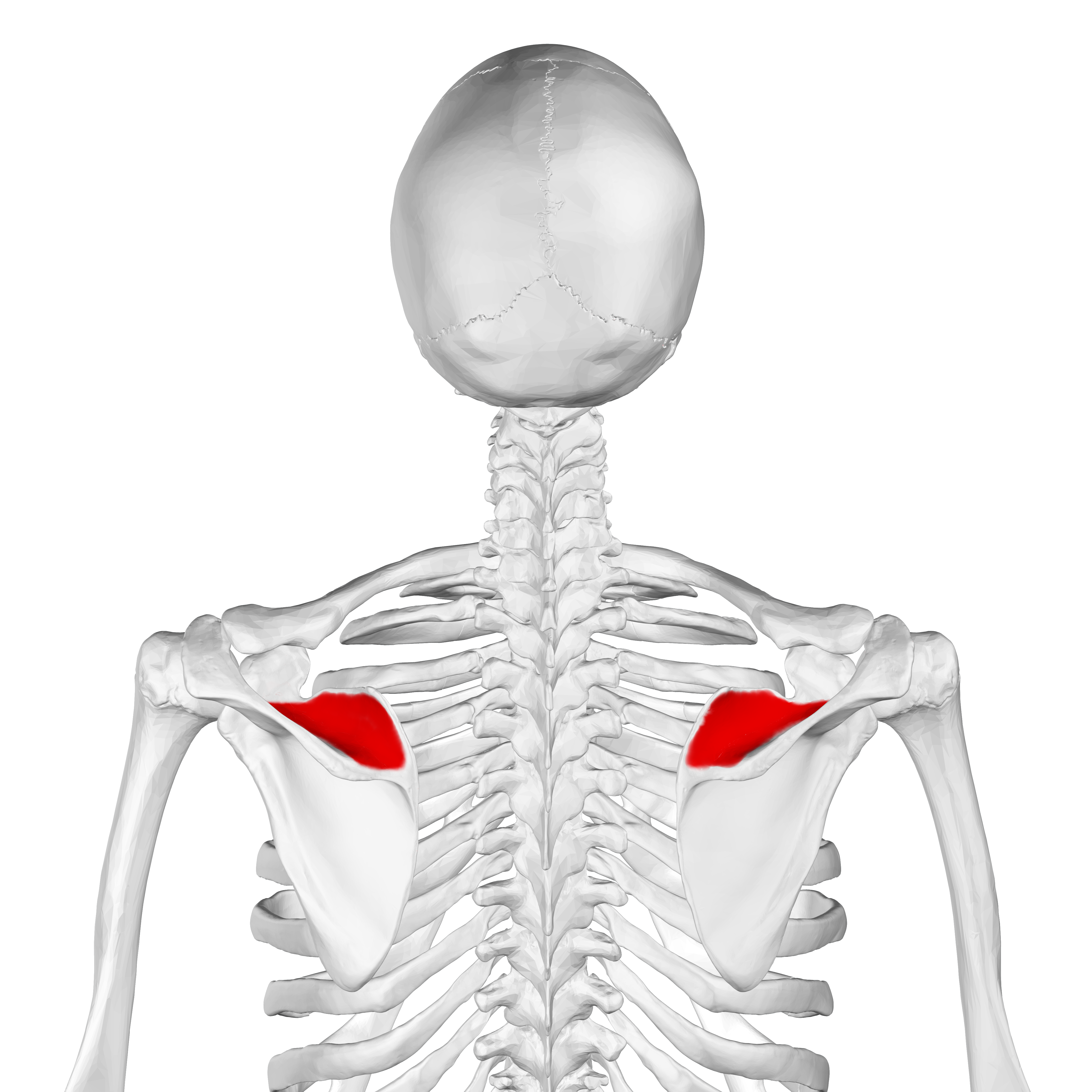
- Left scapula. Dorsal surface. Supraspinatous fossa shown in red.

Details

Identifiers
- Latin: fossa supraspinata
- TA98: A02.4.01.007
- TA2: 1150
- FMA: 23269

The supraspinous fossa (supraspinatus fossa, supraspinatous fossa) of the posterior aspect of the scapula (the shoulder blade) is smaller than the infraspinous fossa, concave, smooth, and broader at its vertebral than at its humeral end. Its medial two-thirds give origin to the supraspinatus muscle.

== Structure ==
The fossa can be exposed by the removal of skin and the superficial fascia of the back and the trapezius muscle.

The supraspinous fossa is bounded by the spine of scapula on the inferior side, acromion process on the lateral side and the superior angle of scapula on the superior side.

Supraspinatus muscle originates from the supraspinous fossa. Distal attachment of the levator scapulae muscle is also on the medial aspect of the fossa.

== Function ==
The suprascapular artery and nerve are found within the fossa. The posterior branch of the suprascapular artery supplies the supraspinatous muscle. Dorsal scapular artery also gives off a collateral branch and anastomoses with the suprascapular artery. Suprascapular nerve from the brachial plexus passes through the suprascapular notch as it approaches the fossa to supply the supraspinatus muscle. Suprascapular artery and nerve descend together but are separated by the superior transverse scapular ligament at the suprascapular notch.

== Clinical significance ==
=== Rotator cuff tear ===
Hollowing in the supraspinous and the infraspinous area is frequently seen as chronic rotator cuff tear resulting in wasting. The wasting may be caused by the supraglenoid cyst compressing the suprascapular nerve and causes a loss of innervation to supraspinatus and infraspinatus muscles. Such wasting or hollowing can be differentially diagnosed as nerve compression or tendon rupture.

== Additional images ==
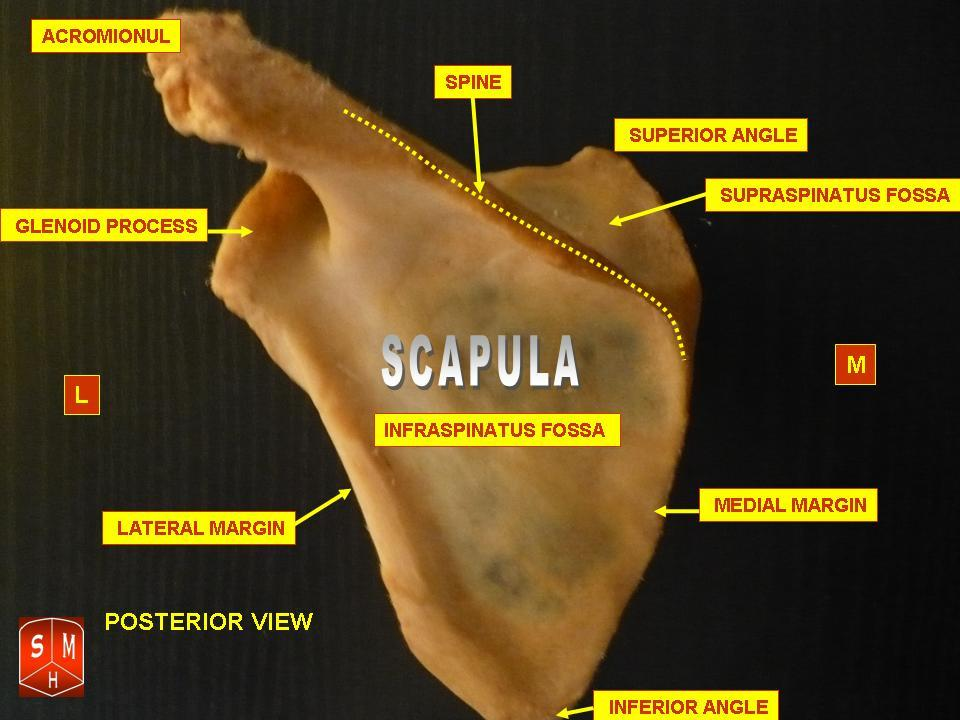
The human scapula

Supraspinous fossa shown in red.

Supraspinous fossa shown in red.

== See also ==
- Supraspinatus muscle
- Scapula
