= Infraspinatus muscle =

Main external rotator of the shoulder

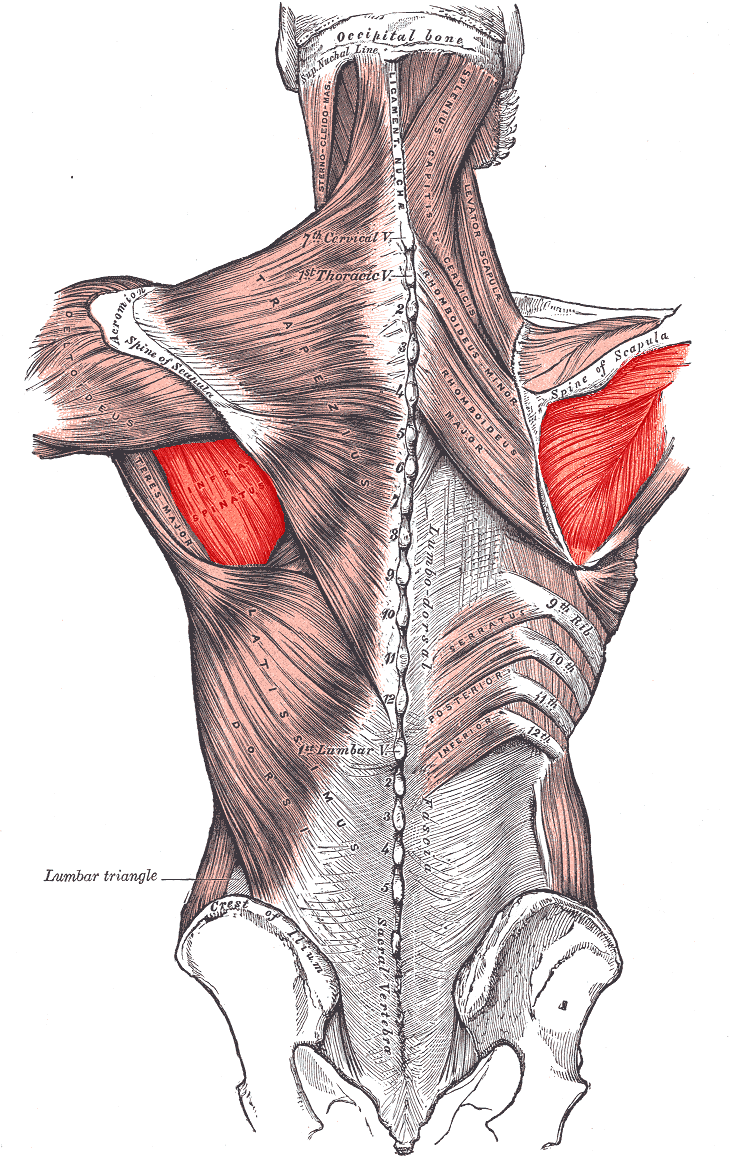
- Muscles connecting the upper extremity to the vertebral column (posterior view).

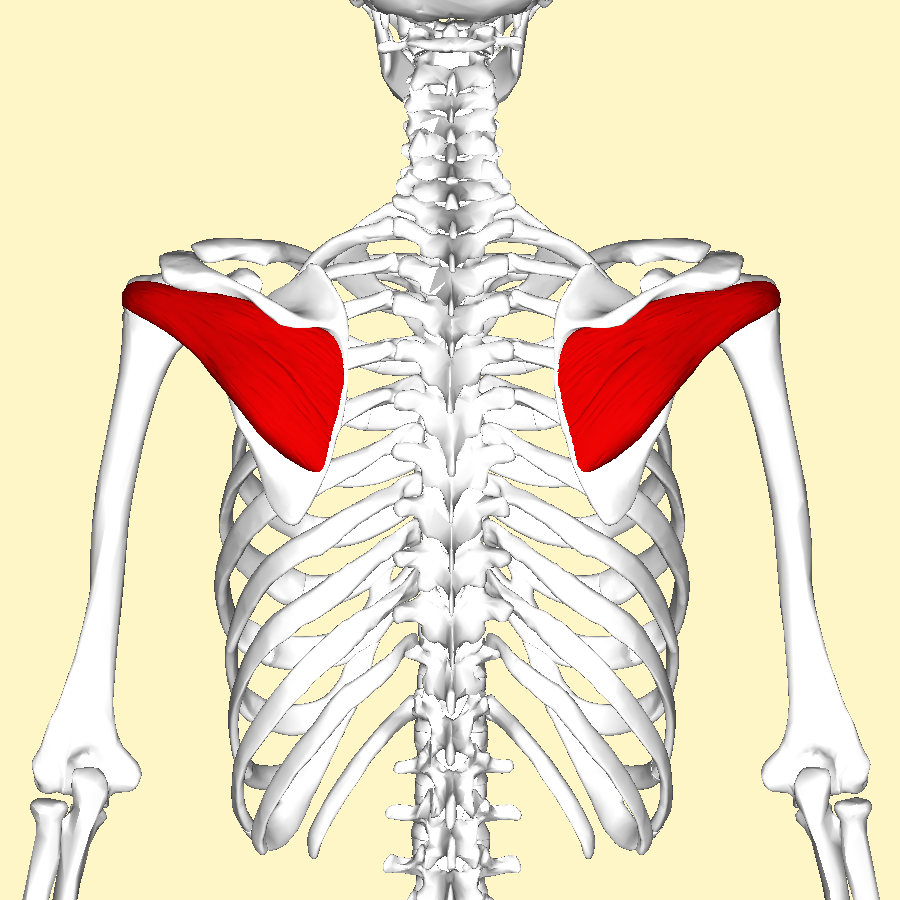
- Infraspinatus muscle (shown in red) seen from behind.

Details
- Origin: Infraspinous fossa of the scapula
- Insertion: Middle facet of greater tubercle of the humerus
- Artery: Suprascapular and circumflex scapular arteries
- Nerve: Suprascapular nerve
- Actions: External rotation of arm and stabilization of glenohumeral joint

Identifiers
- Latin: musculus infraspinatus
- TA98: A04.6.02.008
- TA2: 2458
- FMA: 32546

In mammalian anatomy, the infraspinatus muscle is a thick triangular muscle which occupies the chief part of the infraspinatous fossa. As one of the four muscles of the rotator cuff, the main function of the infraspinatus is to externally rotate the humerus and stabilize the shoulder joint.

== Human anatomy ==
=== Structure ===
It attaches medially to the infraspinous fossa of the scapula and laterally to the middle facet of the greater tubercle of the humerus.

The muscle arises by fleshy fibers from the medial two-thirds of the infraspinatous fossa, and by tendinous fibers from the ridges on its surface; it also arises from the infraspinatous fascia which covers it, and separates it from the teres major and teres minor.

The fibers converge to a tendon, which glides over the lateral border of the spine of the scapula and passing across the posterior part of the capsule of the shoulder-joint, is inserted into the middle impression on the greater tubercle of the humerus. The trapezoidal insertion of the infraspinatus onto the humerus is much larger than the equivalent insertion of the supraspinatus, the reason why the infraspinatus is involved in rotator cuff tears about as frequently as the supraspinatus.

==== Relations ====
The tendon of this muscle is sometimes separated from the capsule of the shoulder-joint by a bursa, which may communicate with the joint cavity.

==== Innervation ====
The suprascapular nerve innervates the supraspinatus and infraspinatus muscles. These muscles function to abduct and laterally rotate the arm, respectively.

==== Variation ====
The infraspinatus is frequently fused with the teres minor.

== Function ==
The infraspinatus is the main external rotator of the shoulder. When the arm is fixed, it adducts the inferior angle of the scapula. Its synergists are teres minor and the deltoid. The infraspinatus and teres minor rotate the head of the humerus outward (external, or lateral, rotation); they also assist in carrying the arm backward. Additionally, the infraspinatus reinforces the capsule of the shoulder joint.

== In other mammals ==
The pectoral muscles – the pectoralis major and pectoralis minor – are thought to have evolved from a primitive muscle sheet that connected the coracoid to the humerus. In late reptilians and early mammals, this muscle structure was displaced dorsally; while most of its components evolved into the pectoralis major, some fibers eventually attached to the scapula and evolved into the supraspinatus, the infraspinatus, and parts of the subscapularis.

== Meat ==
In butchery, the infraspinatus of cattle forms the top blade subprimal, part of the shoulder clod. The large, tough, and chewy sheet or seam of gristle that runs down the middle is the shoulder tendon.

Used whole, the infraspinatus is a top blade roast; cut perpendicularly, it gives top blade steaks; filleted into two long, flat cuts by seam cutting along the tendon then portioned, it gives flat iron steak.

== Additional images ==
Infraspinatus muscle (shown in red). Animation.

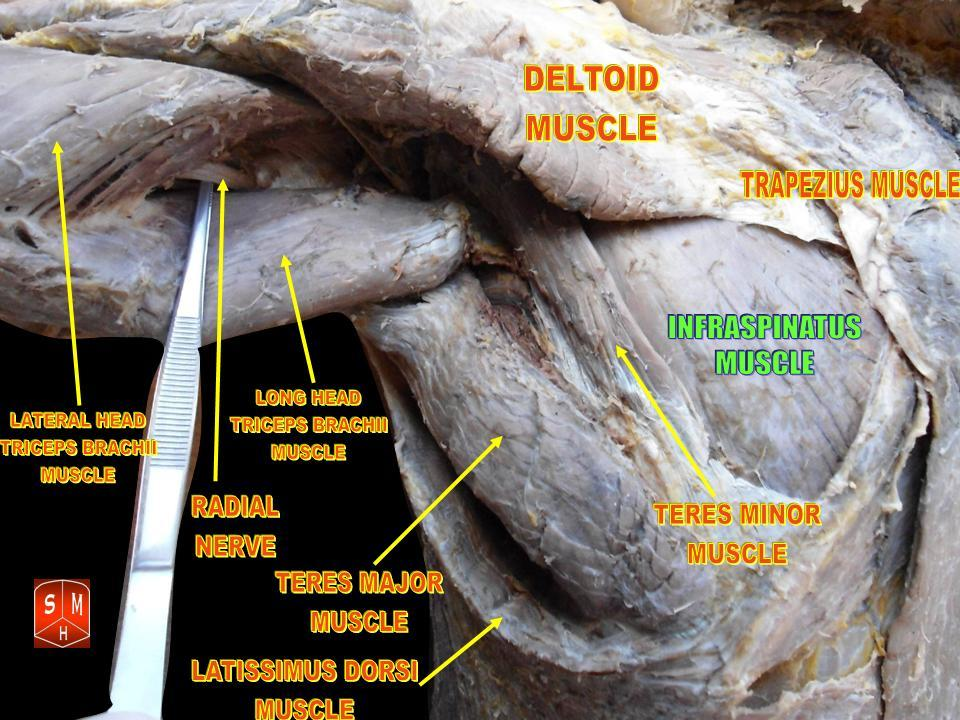
The infraspinatus shown on a cadaver, left shoulder, posterior view.

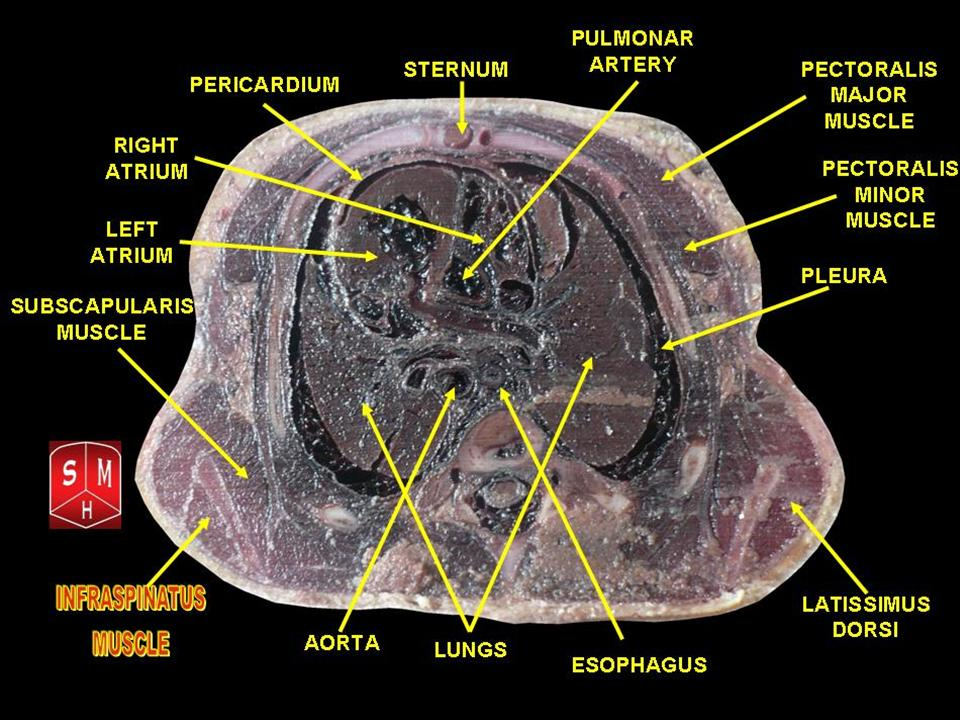
Imaged transverse section of the body through the thorax.
