= Superior transverse scapular ligament =

Ligament of the shoulder blade

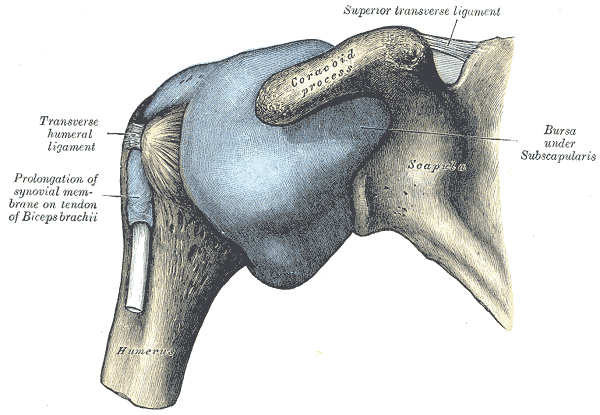
- Capsule of shoulder-joint (distended). Anterior aspect. (Superior transverse ligament visible at upper right.)

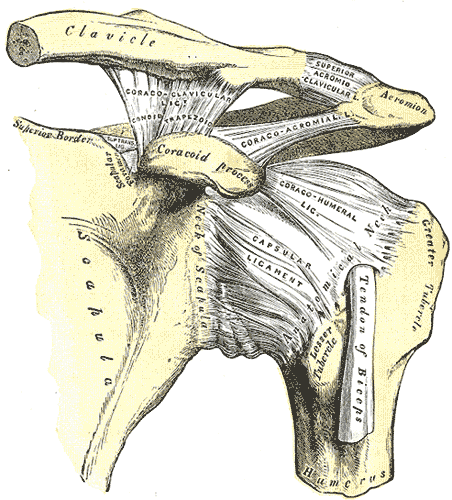
- The left shoulder and acromioclavicular joints, and the proper ligaments of the scapula.

Details
- From: Coracoid process
- To: Suprascapular notch

Identifiers
- Latin: ligamentum transversum scapulae superius
- TA98: A03.5.01.003
- TA2: 1741
- FMA: 25950

The superior transverse ligament (transverse or suprascapular ligament) converts the suprascapular notch into a foramen or opening.

It is a thin and flat fascicle, narrower at the middle than at the extremities, attached by one end to the base of the coracoid process and by the other to the medial end of the scapular notch.

The suprascapular nerve always runs through the foramen; while the suprascapular vessels cross over the ligament in most of the cases.

The suprascapular ligament can become completely or partially ossified. The ligament also been found to split forming doubled space within the suprascapular notch.
