= Supraspinatus muscle =

Muscle of the upper back

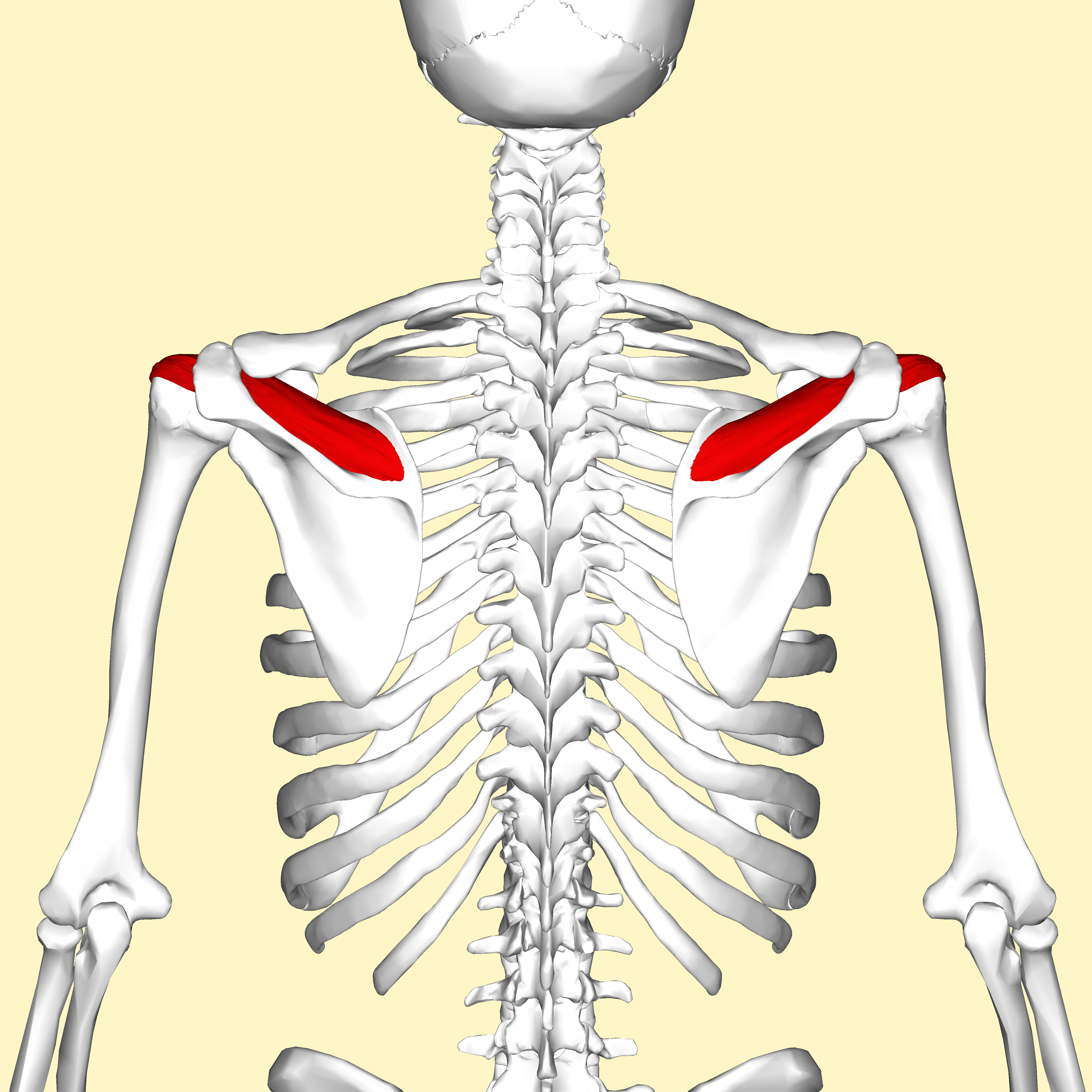
- Position of the supraspinatus muscle (red) seen from the back.

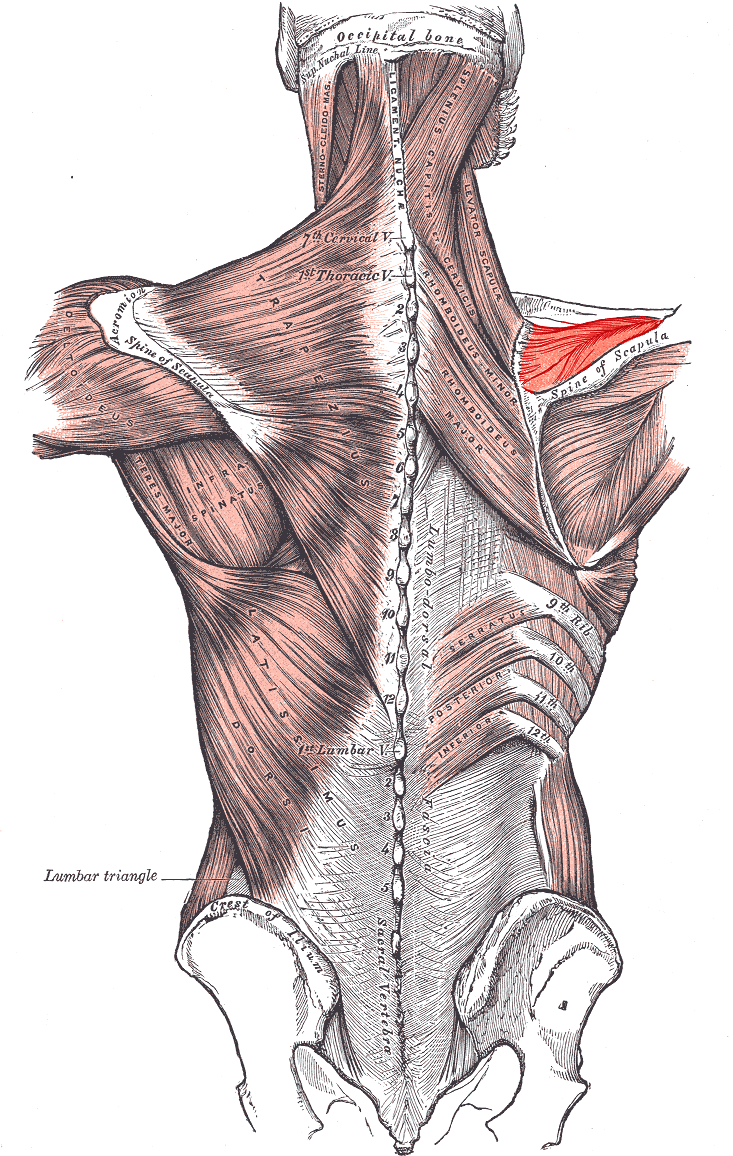
- Posterior view of muscles connecting the upper extremity to the vertebral column. Supraspinatus muscle is labeled in red at right, while it is covered by other muscles at left.

Details
- Origin: Supraspinous fossa of scapula
- Insertion: Superior facet of greater tubercle of humerus
- Artery: Suprascapular artery
- Nerve: Suprascapular nerve
- Actions: Abduction of arm and stabilizes humerus

Identifiers
- Latin: musculus supraspinatus
- TA98: A04.6.02.006
- TA2: 2457
- FMA: 9629

The supraspinatus (pl.: supraspinati) is a relatively small muscle of the upper back that runs from the supraspinous fossa superior portion of the scapula (shoulder blade) to the greater tubercle of the humerus. It is one of the four rotator cuff muscles and also abducts the arm at the shoulder. The spine of the scapula separates the supraspinatus muscle from the infraspinatus muscle, which originates below the spine.

== Structure ==
=== Origin ===
The supraspinatus muscle arises from the medial two-thirds supraspinous fossa of the scapula.

=== Insertion ===
The supraspinatus tendon inserts onto the superior facet of the greater tubercle of the humerus.

=== Relations ===
The supraspinatus muscle tendon passes laterally beneath the cover of the acromion. The tendon blends with the shoulder joint capsule.

=== Nerve supply ===
The supraspinatus muscle is innervated by suprascapular nerve (C5-6) of the upper trunk of the brachial plexus.

== Function ==
The supraspinatus muscle performs abduction of the arm, and pulls the head of the humerus medially towards the glenoid cavity. It independently prevents the head of the humerus from slipping inferiorly. The supraspinatus works in cooperation with the deltoid muscle to perform abduction, including when the arm is in an adducted position. Beyond 15 degrees, the deltoid muscle becomes increasingly more effective at abducting the arm and becomes the main propagator of this action.

== Clinical significance ==
The supraspinatus forms part of the rotator cuff and is one of its most frequently damaged components, whether from acute injury or gradual degeneration. Bad posture and age are leading risk factors, with a high prevalence of asymptomatic partial and full tears, as well as symptomatic syndromes with chronic pain. Associated pathologies include acromial impingement, frozen shoulder, and poor sleep, especially on the affected side. Both ultrasound and MRI are useful methods of diagnosis.

=== Tear ===
==== Diagnosis ====
Antero-posterior projectional radiography of the shoulder may demonstrate a high-riding humeral head, with an acromiohumeral distance of less than 7 millimetres (0.28 in).

==== Repair ====
Prompt arthroscopic surgery for acute (recent) supraspinatus tears improves shoulder functionality compared to delayed surgery. The Canadian Shoulder and Elbow Society recommends that traumatic tears (e.g., a sudden injury sustained during a bad fall) should be treated within 12 weeks of the injury.

For older, non-athletic people with partial-thickness tears, it is common to attempt three to six months of conservative, non-surgical treatment, such as corticosteroid injections or physical therapy. If this does not resolve the pain, then surgical repair followed by six months of physical therapy is typically warranted.

Arthroscopic treatment of rotator cuff calcification is effective. Calcification of the supraspinatus tendon is a major contributor to shoulder pain in the general population and is often worsened following a supraspinatus tear. Before surgery, supraspinatus tendonitis should be ruled out as the cause of pain.

=== Paralysis ===
The suprascapular nerve which innervates the supraspinatus can be damaged along its course in fractures of the overlying clavicle, which can reduce the person's ability to initiate the abduction.

== Gallery ==
Position of the supraspinatus muscle (shown in red). Animation.

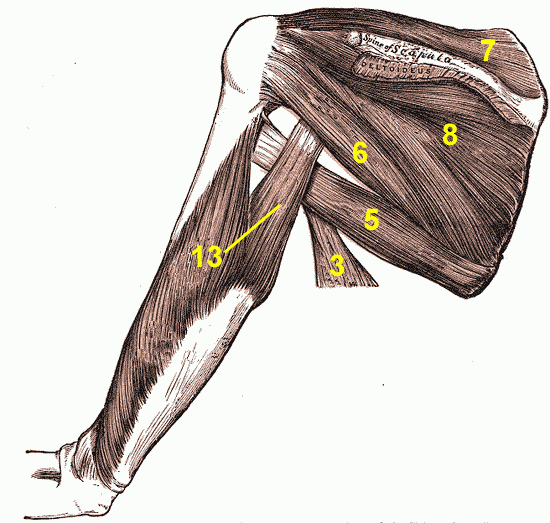
Muscles around the left shoulder, seen from behind.
3. Latissimus dorsi muscle
5. Teres major muscle
6. Teres minor muscle
7. Supraspinatus muscle
8. Infraspinatus muscle
13. long head of Triceps brachii muscle.

Action of right supraspinatus muscle, anterior view. Three bones shown are acromion (top) and coracoid process (center) of scapula, and humerus (left).

Diagram of the human shoulder joint, front view

Diagram of the human shoulder joint, back view
