= Infraspinous fossa =

Part of the shoulder blade

Infraspinatous fossa
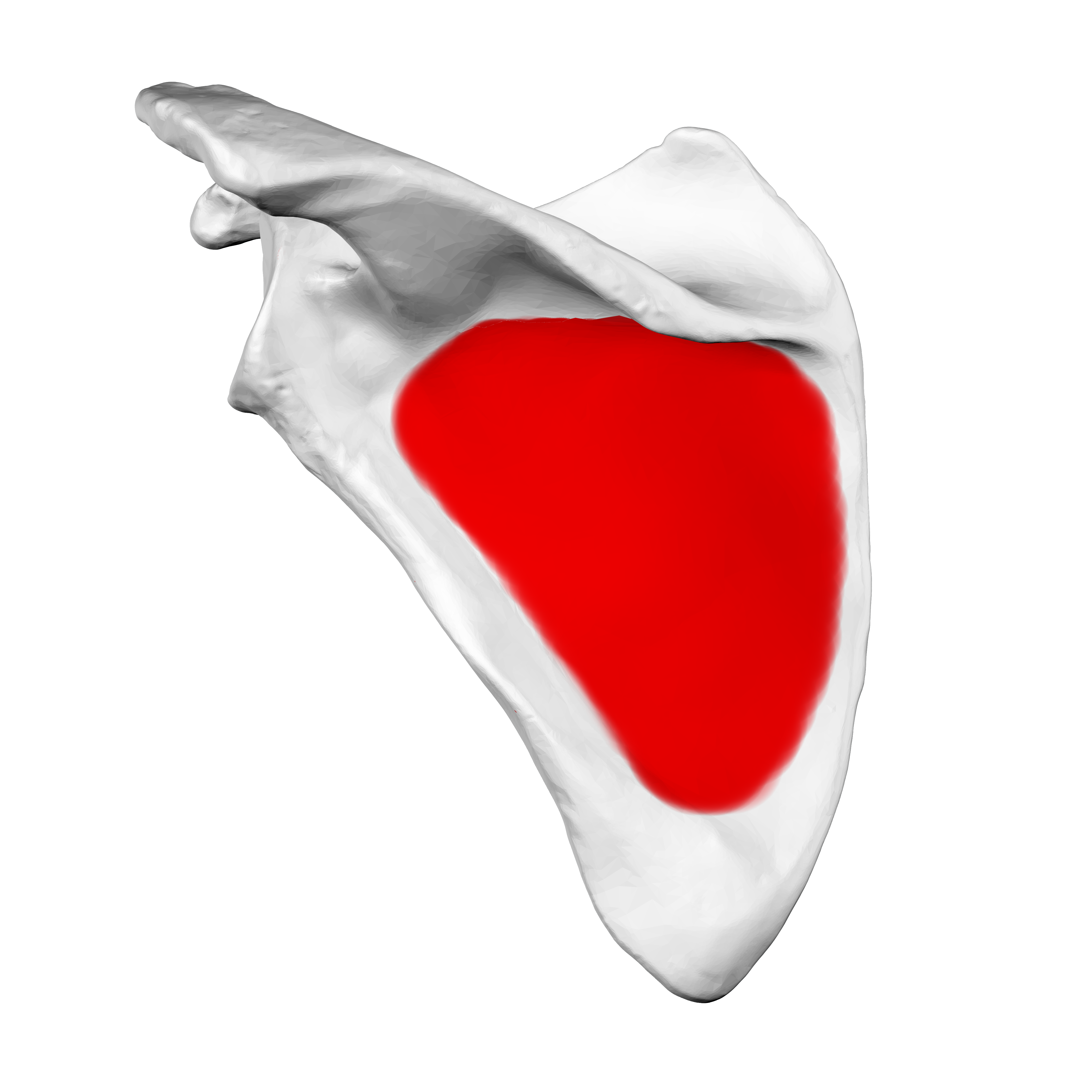
- Left scapula. Dorsal surface. Infraspinatous fossa shown in red.

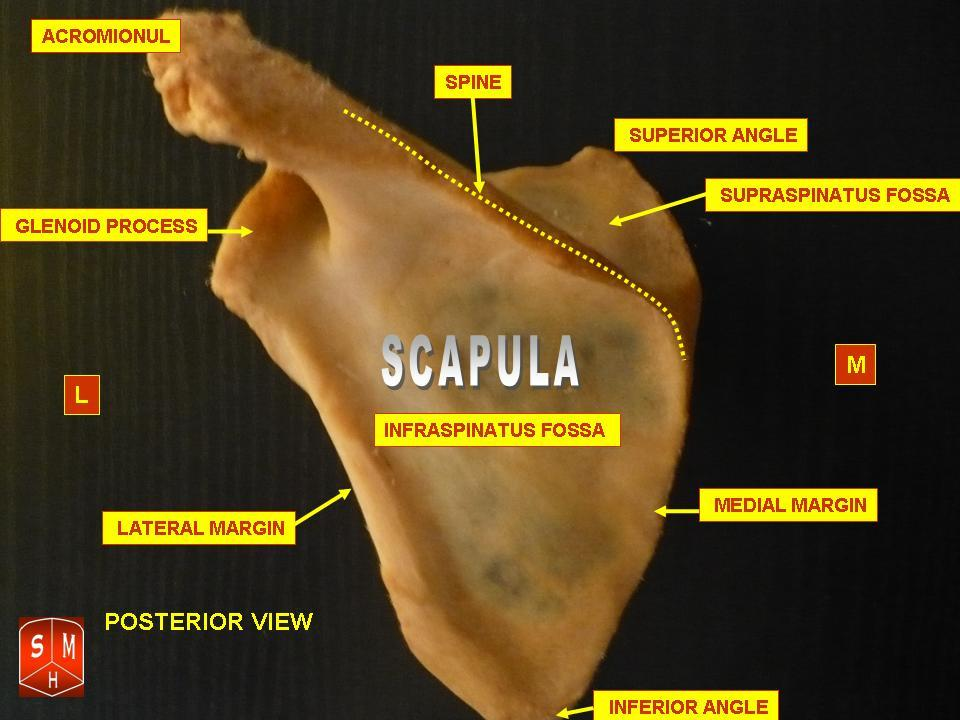
- Left scapula. Dorsal surface. Infraspinatous fossa labeled at center.

Details

Identifiers
- Latin: fossa infraspinata
- TA98: A02.4.01.008
- TA2: 1151
- FMA: 23272

The infraspinous fossa (infraspinatus fossa or infraspinatous fossa) of the scapula is much larger than the supraspinatous fossa; toward its vertebral margin a shallow concavity is seen at its upper part; its center presents a prominent convexity, while near the axillary border is a deep groove which runs from the upper toward the lower part.

The medial two-thirds of the fossa give origin to the infraspinatus; the lateral third is covered by this muscle.

== Additional images ==
Left scapula. Infraspinatous fossa shown in red.

Animation. Infraspinatous fossa shown in red.

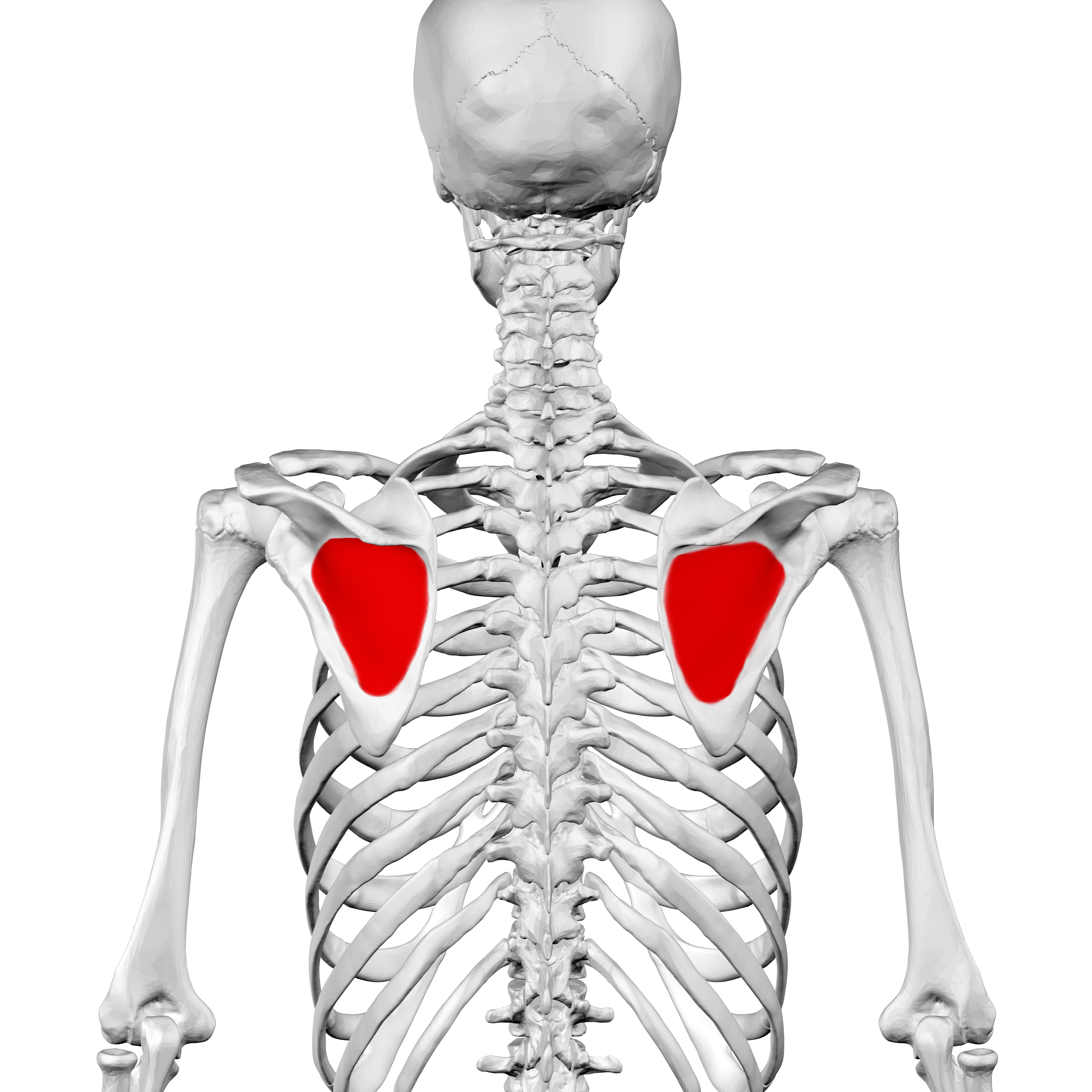
Still image.

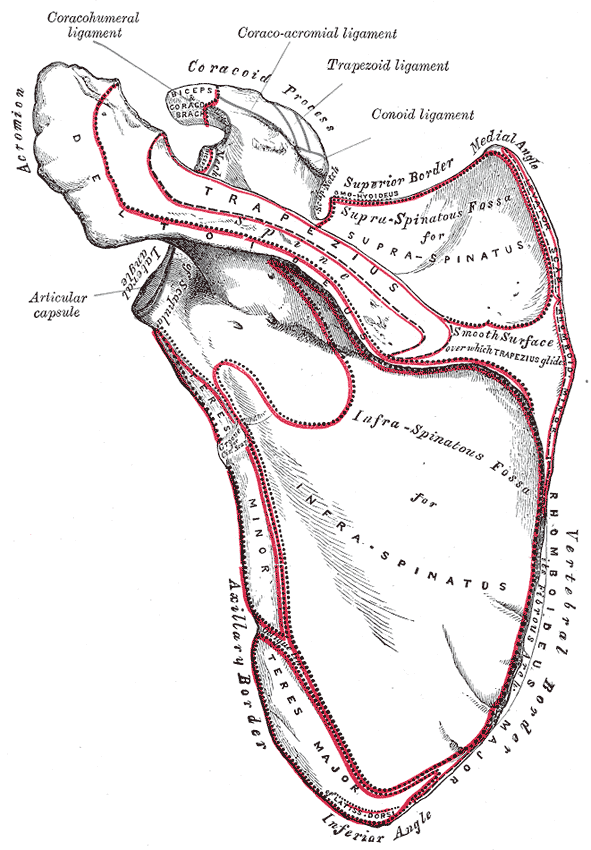
Left scapula. Dorsal surface. ("Infra-spinatous" fossa visible at bottom right.)

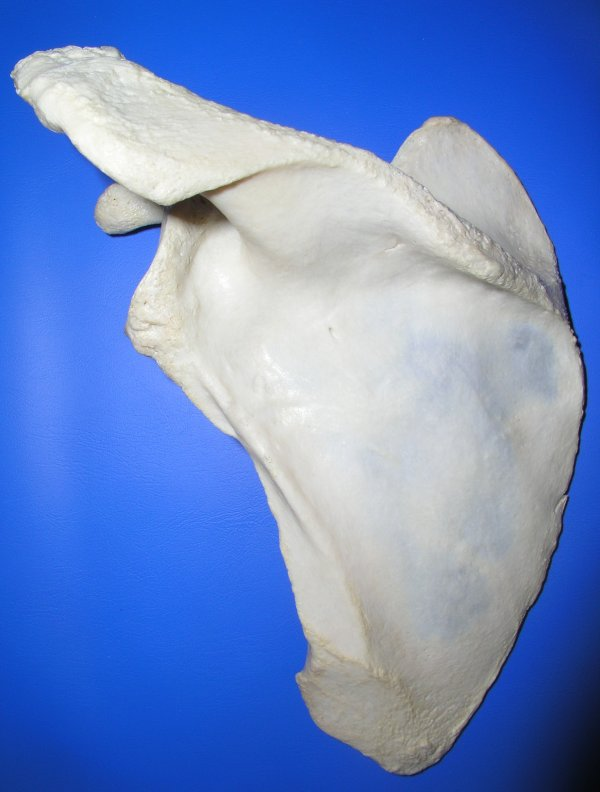
Left scapula. Dorsal surface. Infraspinatous fossa not labeled, but visible at center.

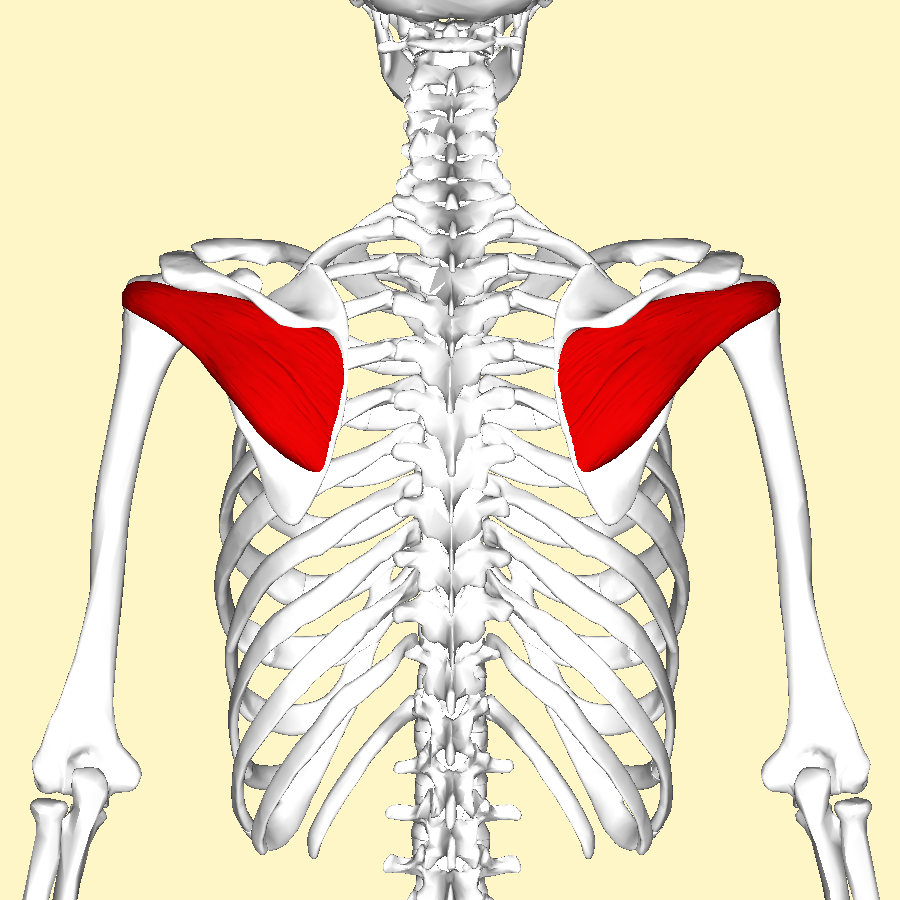
Infraspinatus muscle seen from behind.

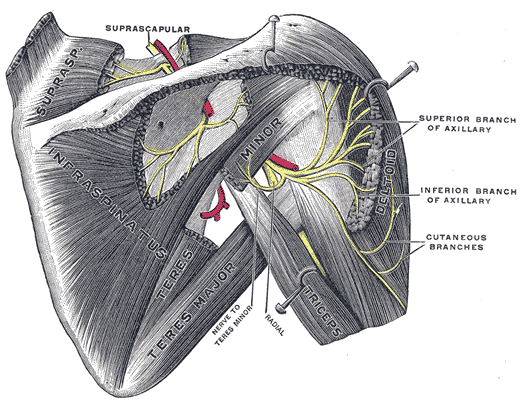
Suprascapular and axillary nerves of right side, seen from behind.
