= Transverse humeral ligament =

Ligament of the shoulder

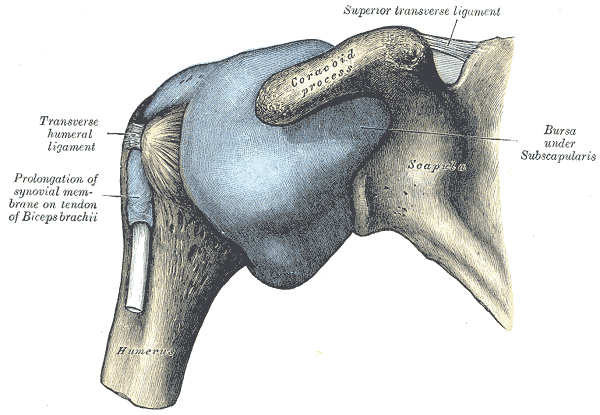
- Capsule of shoulder joint (distended). Anterior aspect. (Transverse humeral ligament labeled at center left.)

Details
- From: Greater tubercle
- To: Lesser tubercle

Identifiers
- Latin: ligamentum transversum humeri
- TA98: A03.5.08.005
- TA2: 1771
- FMA: 38406

The transverse humeral ligament (Brodie's ligament) forms a broad band bridging the lesser and greater tubercle of the humerus. Its attachments are limited superior to the epiphysial line. By enclosing the canal of the bicipital groove (intertubercular groove), it functions to hold the long head of the biceps tendon within the bicipital groove.

Studies using MRIs, cadaver dissections, and histological analysis suggest that the transverse humeral ligament may not actually be a ligament, but simply a portion of the tendon of the supraspinatus muscle often mistaken for a separate ligament during dissections.
