= Anatomy of Palaeotherium =

Studies of a genus of palaeothere

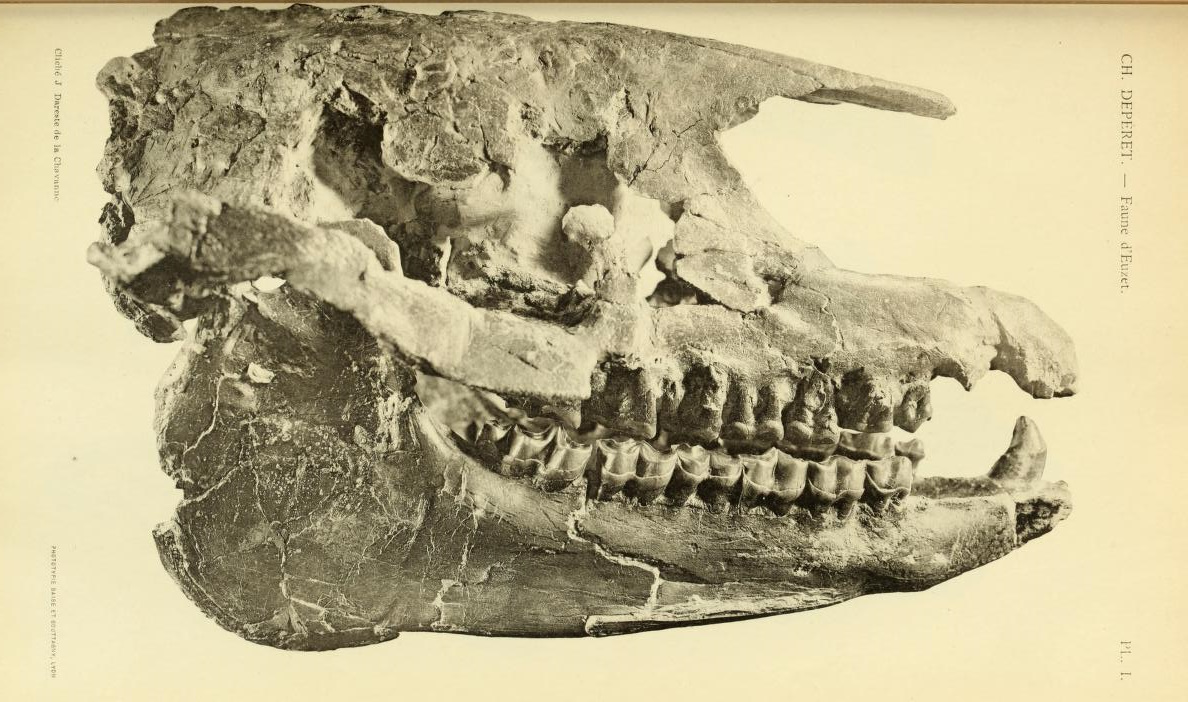
Photograph of a P. crassum skull, 1917

The anatomy of Palaeotherium has been historically well-studied due to at least several of its species being known from common and good fossil material. As the type genus of the Palaeotheriidae, one of two families within the Equoidea, it shares common traits such as orbits that are wide in its back plus located in the skull's midlength, long nasal bones, selenodont form molars, and the presence of diastemata between the canine and other teeth between it. Palaeotherium itself differs from other palaeotheres primarily based on various cranial and dental traits; the subgenus Palaeotherium is likewise distinguished from the other subgenus Franzenitherium based on specialized and specific cranial traits. While not as often studied, Palaeotherium is also known by viable limb bone material, leading to the locomotion of different species being hypothesized. P. magnum, unlike other species, is known by complete skeletal material such as that from Mormoiron in France that is informative about its overall anatomy, sharing similar and different traits from equines and other perissodactyls.

== Skull ==
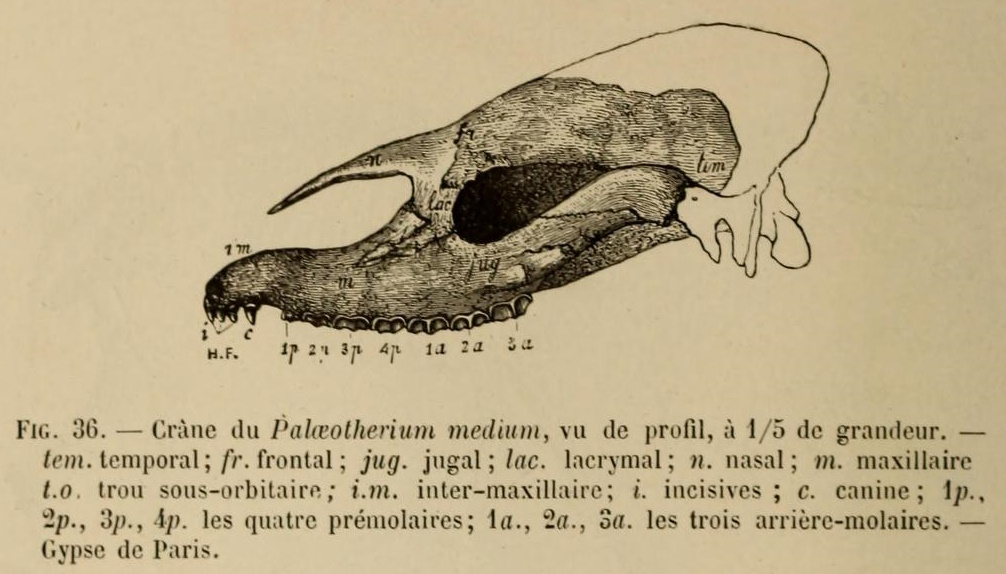
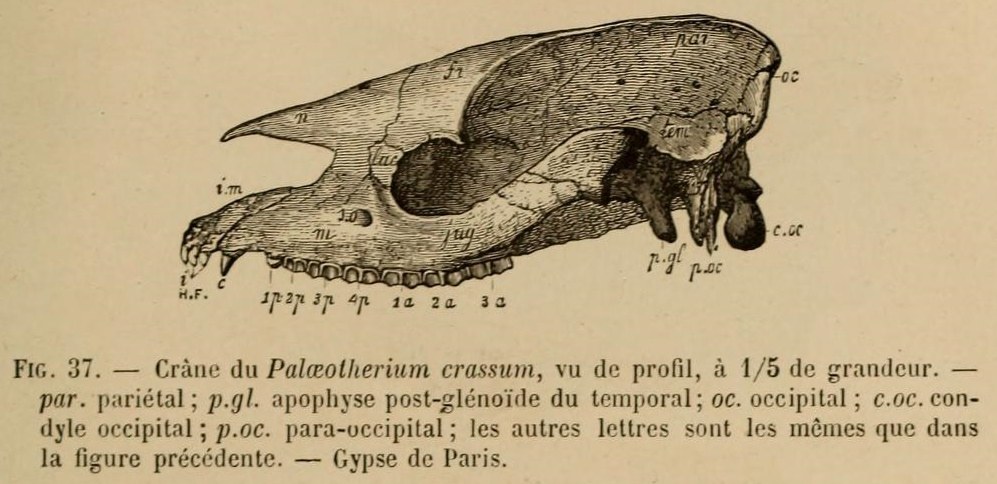
Illustrations of the craniums of P. medium (left) and P. crassum (right) with labeled cranial and dental portions, 1878

The Palaeotheriidae is diagnosed in part as generally having orbits that are wide open in the back area and are located in the middle of the skull or in a slight frontal area of it. The nasal bones are slightly extensive to very extensive in depth. Palaeotherium is characterized as having calvaria that range in base length from 150 mm (5.9 in) to 520 mm (20 in) depending on the species. The pterygoid crest, which is located on the pterygoid processes of the sphenoid bone, does not cover the optic foramen, which is separated from other cranial cavities at the temporal fossa. The zygomatic process of the squamosal bone is elongated and extends to the maxilla at a back angle of the orbit. The genus is also diagnosed by the presence of an anastomosis (anatomical connection between two passageways) roughly at the sphenoid bone and prominent temporalis muscle developments.

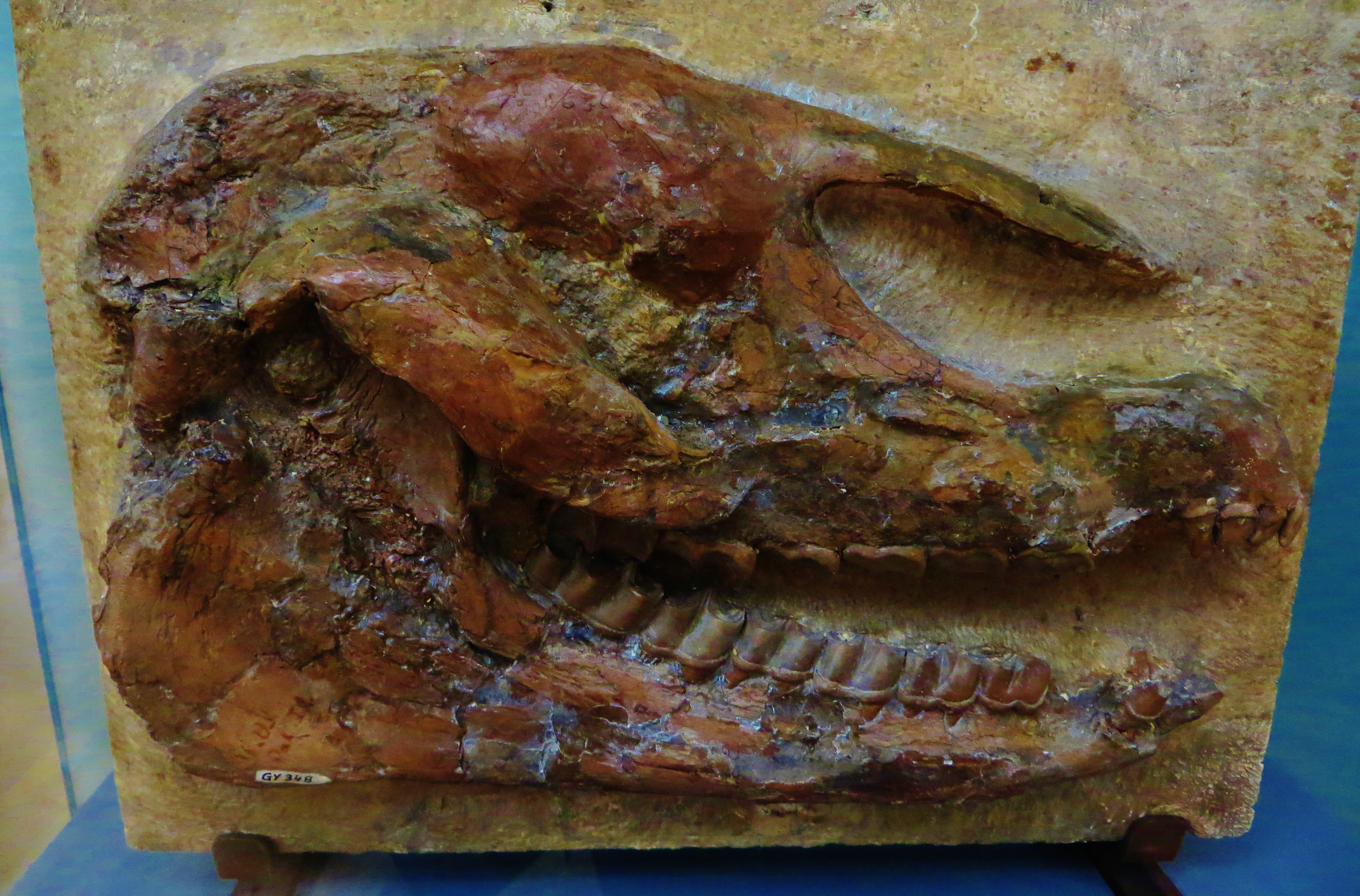
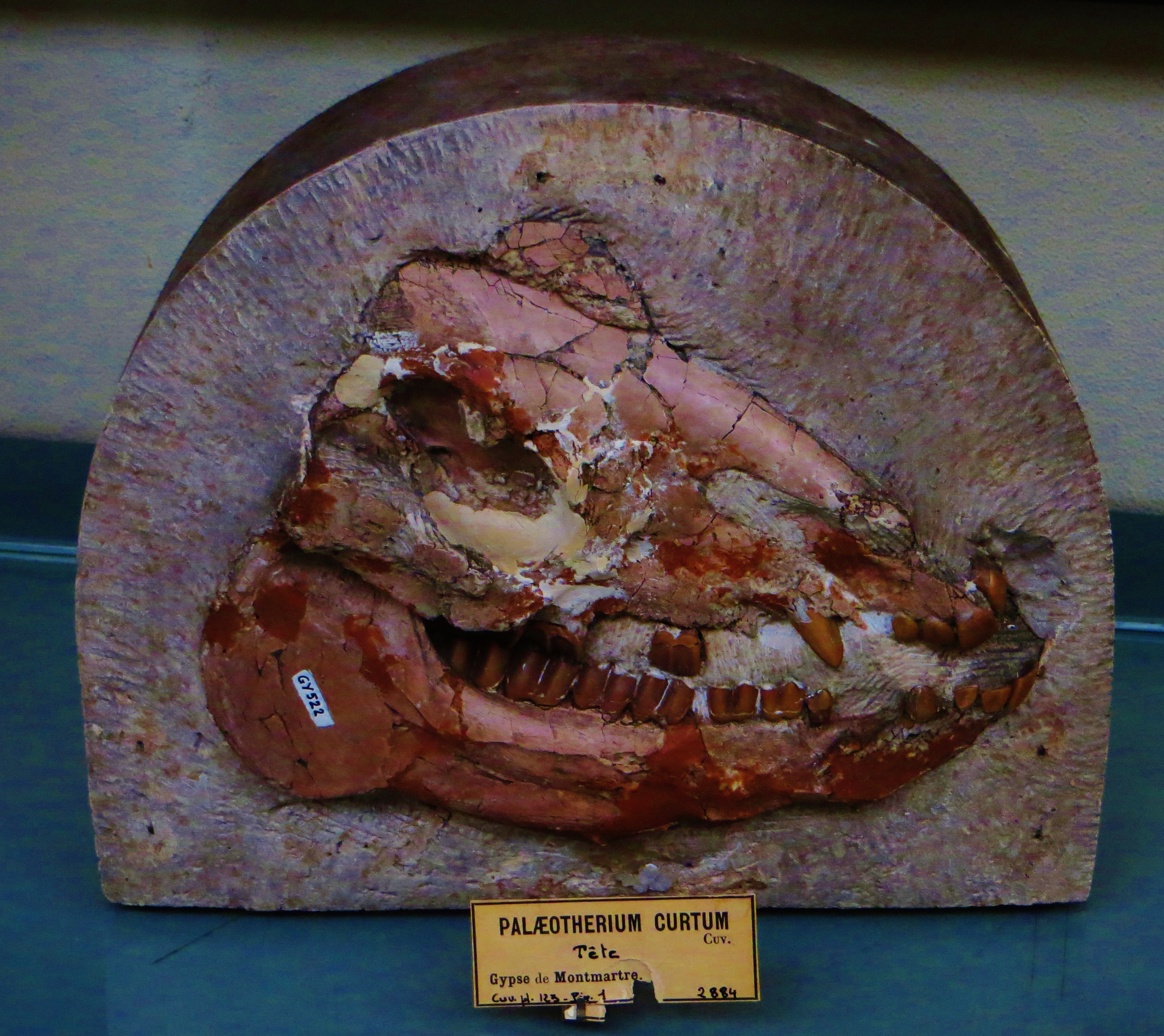
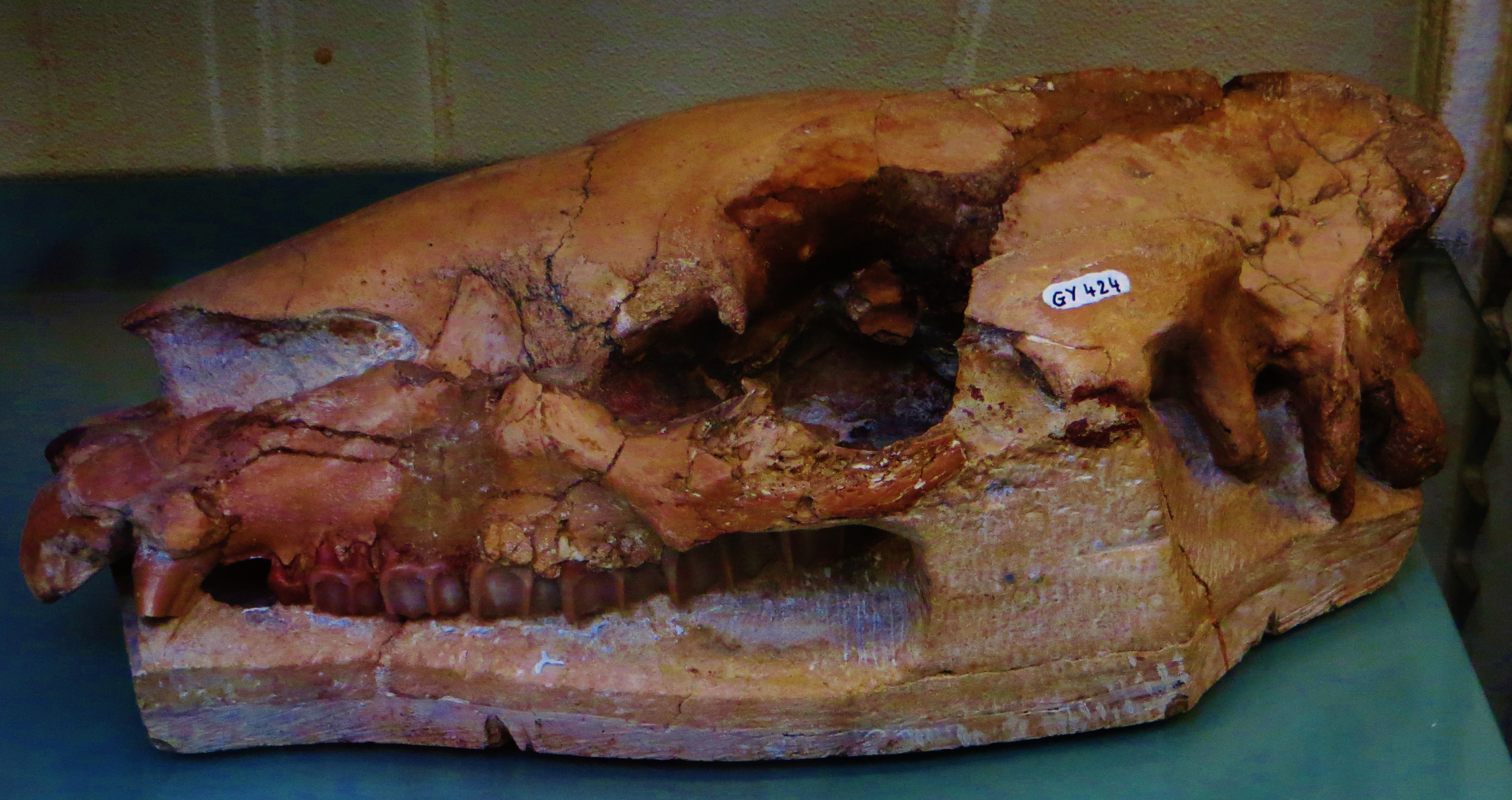
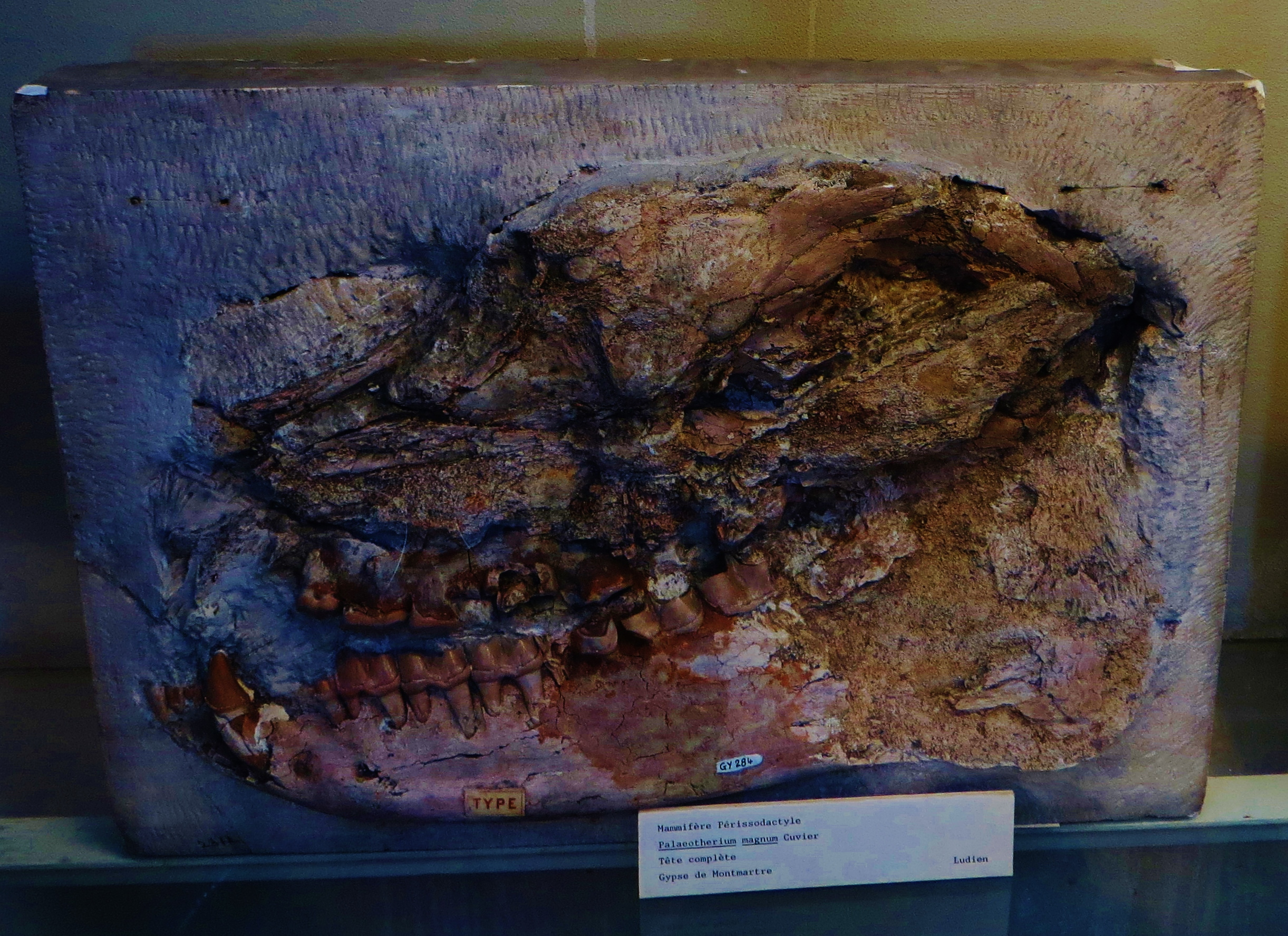
Palaeotherium spp. skulls, National Museum of Natural History, France. Clockwise from upper left: P. medium, P. curtum, P. magnum, and P. crassum.

According to Remy, the subgenus Palaeotherium is the more specialized one of the two, characterized by the orbit being located more in front of the skull's middle length. The optic foramen is separated by a bony wall, and there are two optic canals in total. The cranium is constricted in its front area behind the postorbital processes and close to the suture for the frontal bone and parietal bone. The other subgenus Franzenitherium in comparison has more generalized skull traits, its orbit being aligned within the middle length of the head. It has a front constriction of the cranium near the postorbital processes, and the optic foramen crosses through the skull from one side to the other. Not all species are placed in any subgenus due to having inadequate skull evidence for further analyses.

The height and weight proportions of the skull of Palaeotherium are roughly equivalent with those of other taxa within the Equoidea. In comparison to other equoids where the skull's maximum width extends above the front root of the parallel zygomatic arches, those of Palaeotherium and most other palaeotheres (except Leptolophus) extend back to the joint of the squamosal bone and mandible. Unlike that of Plagiolophus, the maxillary hiatus, or an opening of the maxillary sinus, in Palaeotherium is wide, diamond-shaped, and has oblique back edges. Palaeotherium differs from most other palaeotheres by the nasal opening stretching up to the P^{3} tooth at minimum (noticeable in P. duvali and P. siderolithicum) or up to the front edge of the orbit above M^{3} in the case of P. magnum. Similar to other palaeotheres, the back process (tissue projection) of the premaxilla is reduced, but its morphology can vary. The maxilla can extend to the nasal opening but can also vary in proportions. While the shapes and proportions of the nasal bones vary by species, they extend beyond P^{1} in adults and sometimes even the canine like in equines. The nasomaxillary suture, which unites the maxilla and nasal bones, is short and strongly curved.

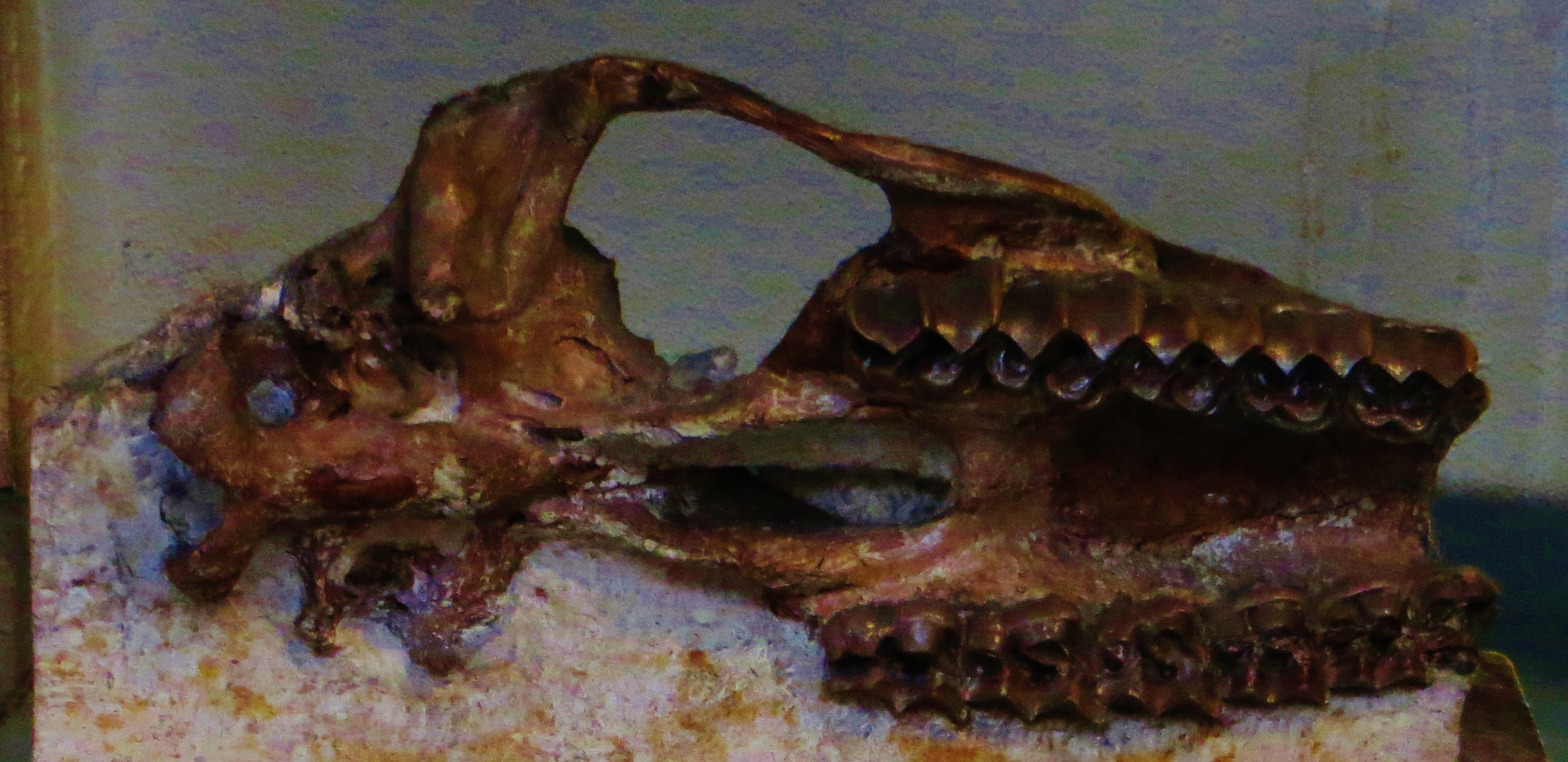
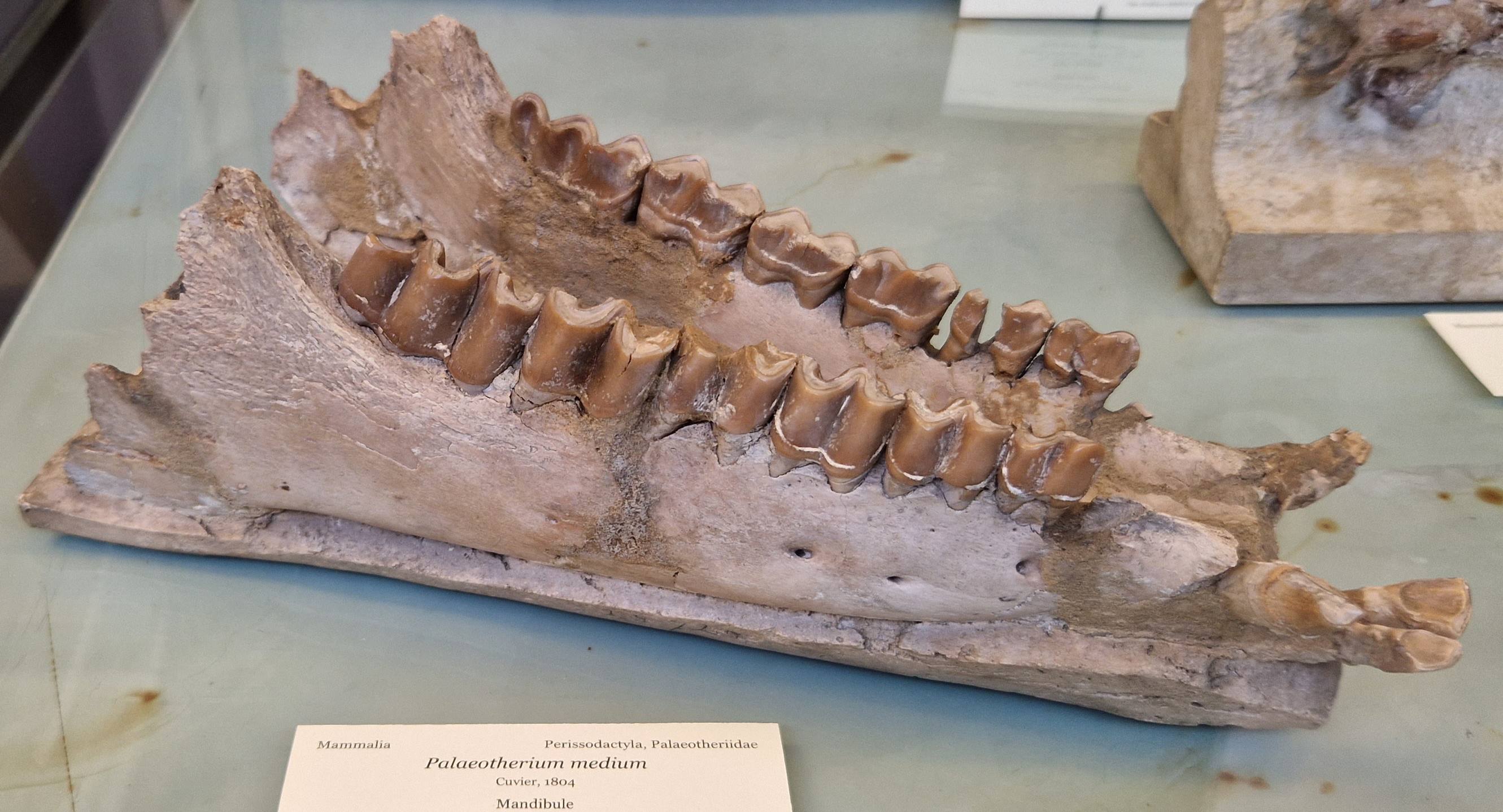
Cranium of P. curtum (left) and mandible of P. medium (right), National Museum of Natural History, France

The jugal bone and lacrimal bone, both located in front of the orbit, are weak in development. The latter bone is elongated in its back and touches the posterolateral process of the nasal bones. Members of the Equoidea have relatively shortened front areas of the face. The orbits of Palaeotherium, unlike those of other equoids, are proportionally smaller and are situated somewhat in front of the skull's mid-length area; they might be more forwards in the case of P. medium. Similar to other Palaeogene equoids, the front edge of the orbit is aligned with M^{1} or M^{2} while the back area is wide. In most species, the infraorbital foramen in adults is located above P^{4} or M^{1}; in P. curtum frohnstettense, it extends to above M^{2}. Each zygomatic arch is wide, and its uneven narrowing in the front area under the orbit may be the result of either species traits or sexual differentiation. The squamosal process of the postorbital is elongated and reaches the maxilla at a back angle of the orbital floor, the roof of the maxillary sinus. The orbit is shallow within its front area, its back opening of the infraorbital canal having a small distance of 10 mm (0.39 in) to 15 mm (0.59 in). The canal itself is smaller than those of most other palaeotheriines except for that of Leptolophus, and it has a tendency to shorten in later species.

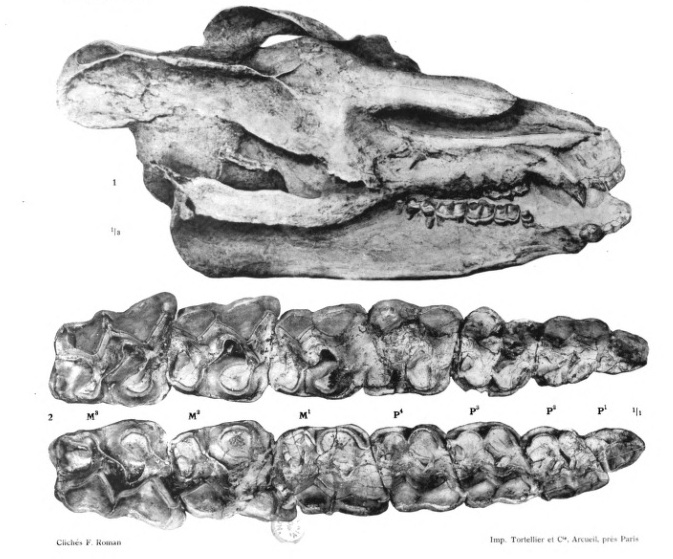
Skull of P. magnum and upper dentition of the same species from another specimen, both from Mormoiron

The side wall of the snout is usually concave but may be interrupted by other local concavities that are normally poorly distinguished. The palatine bone has a well-developed front area, which in the case of P. curtum villerealense can rise near the orbit's top. The sphenopalatine foramen, large and oval-shaped, is above the back of M^{4}. The optic canal is small, has a primitive form of opening in front of the pterygoid crest, and is separated from it by a thick bony wall except in the cases of P. lautricense and P. duvali. Whereas there are two optic canals in most species that are nearly parallel of each other and separate in the end, there is only one long one in P. lautricense and possibly P. duvali. The sphenoid bone's wings are well-developed in their backs, and a suture for the parietal and sphenoid bones separates the frontal bone from the squamosal bone. The postorbital processes of the frontal bone are not very elongated. The cranial vault is broad, domed, and wider than the overall skull. The maximum front narrowing of the cranium, with the exceptions of those of P. lautricense and P. duvali, is set far back to roughly where the frontoparietal suture occurs. The skull's top peaks at the far back area, although this is not observed in P. lautricense. The sagittal crest can be prominent and depends on the age and sex of the individual for development. The nuchal crest, where the neck attaches to the head, is prominent and, except in P. lautricense, extends outwards plus backwards past the occipital condyles. The temporal fossae are large but vary in proportion. In Palaeotherium and not Plagiolophus, the overall basicranium's axis is thick plus wide.

The horizontal ramus of the mandible is overall thick plus tall and has an elongated mandibular symphysis, but the width and lower area morphology vary by species. It is wide in both the front and back areas and low compared to equines. The joint for the squamosal and mandible of Palaeotherium is low compared to those of Plagiolophus and Leptolophus. The angular process, located above the angle of the mandible, is blocked from further expansion by the mandibular notch and is well-developed in its rear like in Palaeogene equids. The coronoid process of the mandible, an upper eminence, is both broad in the front plus back and stocky. The condyloid process, an upper process of the mandible, is transversely elongated and cylindrical in shape. Both the zygomatico-mandibular fossa and pterygoid fossa are prominent.

== Dentition ==
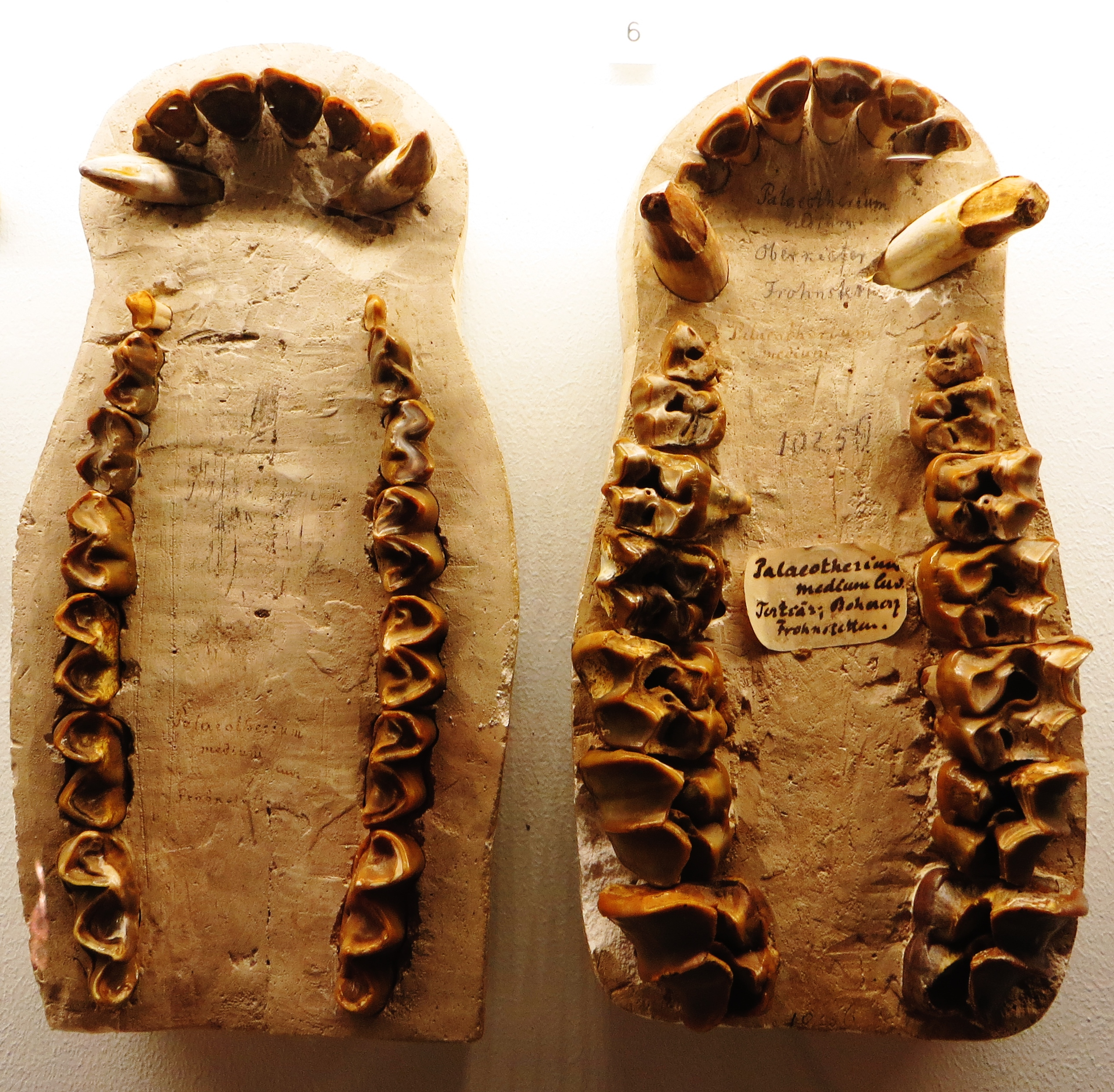
P. muehlbergi dentition, The Paleontological Collection of the University of Tübingen

Derived palaeotheres are generally diagnosed as having selenolophodont (selenodont-lophodont ridge form) upper molars and selenodont (crescent-shaped ridge form) lower molars that are mesodont, or medium-crowned, in height. The canines (C) strongly protrude and are separated from the premolars (P) by medium to long diastemata (gaps between two close teeth) and from the incisors (I) by short ones in both the upper and lower dentition. The other teeth are paired closely with each other in both the upper and lower rows. The dental formula of Palaeotherium is 3.1.4.33.1.4.3 for a total of 44 teeth, consistent with the primitive dental formula for early-middle Palaeogene placental mammals. The post-canine diastemata of Palaeotherium are small. The premolars and preceding deciduous teeth both tend to have molarized forms (meaning molar-like shapes) and have newly developing hypocone cusps on them. The mesostyle cusp (a small cusp type) present in the molars (M) thicken from M^{1} to M^{3}. The lingual lobes (or divisions) in the upper molars are closely aligned with the ectolophs (crests or ridges of upper molar teeth). The ectolophs themselves are W-shaped, being made up of two articulated crescents.

The incisors are shovel-shaped and, like in modern horses, are used for chewing at right angles in relation to their longitudinal axes. They have no cutting functions but instead are used for grasping food akin to how tweezers grasp items. The canines are proportionally large-sized and are dagger-shaped. They were probably not used for cutting or chewing food given how they are oriented. Instead, they were probably used for biting functions for self-defense and sexual selection.

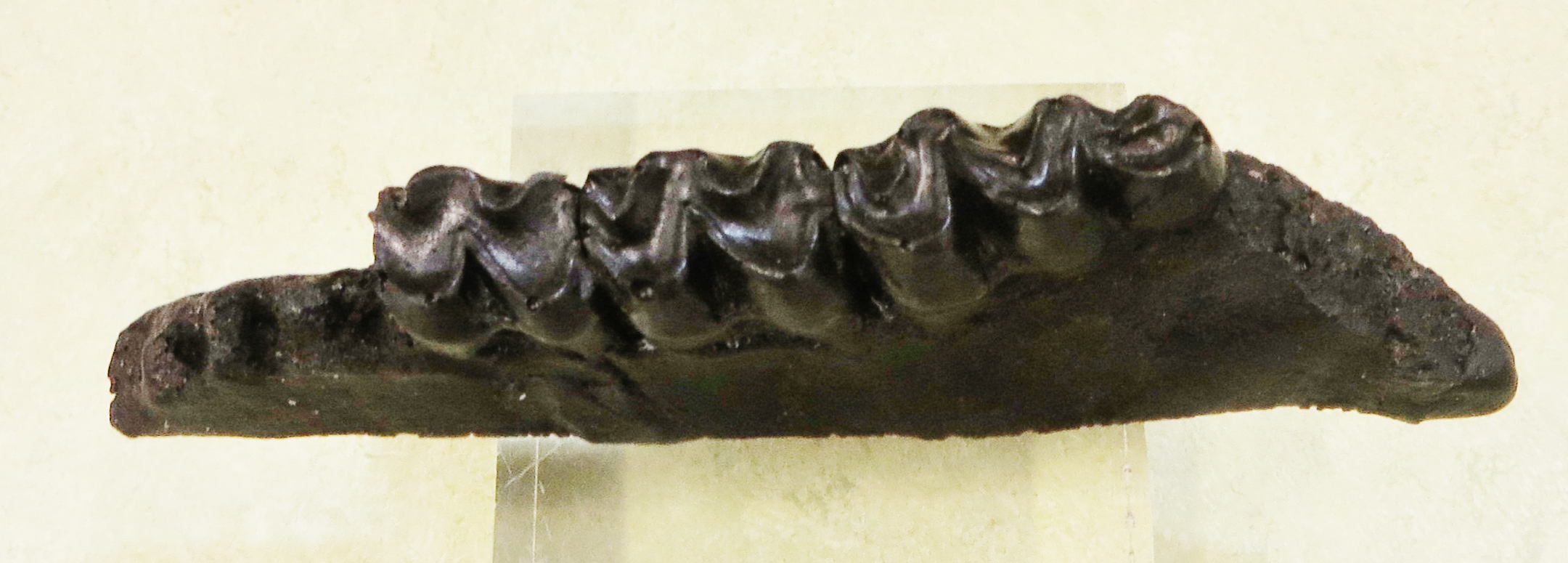
P. ruetimeyeri dentition, Goldfuß-Museum at the University of Bonn

The decreased length of the postcanine diastema in Palaeotherium and the equid subfamily Anchitheriinae may be correlated with increases in body size. The trend may be due to the necessity to improve chewing performances through molarization and proportional size increases of the premolars and the enlargements of the molar row, the latter trend of which may play a role in decreasing diastamata lengths. Early species such as P. castrense have nearly absent postcanine diastemata. In later species, the postcanine diastema can vary from shortened such as in P. crassum and P. curtum to elongated like in P. medium and P. magnum. The separation of cheek teeth from the incisors and canines attests to their independent and specific chewing functions. The distance from the canine to the second premolar is up to twenty percent (twenty-five percent in the case of P. magnum) of the total length of the second premolar to third molar dental row.

Late Eocene species of Palaeotherium tend to have more molariform premolars. The non-molarized premolars are composed of four to five cusps (one to two external, two intermediate, and one internal) while the molarized premolars and molars have six cusps (two external, two intermediate, and two internal). The upper molars are medium-crowned (shorter than those of modern equids) and have ectolophs that are about twice the height of the inner cusps and curve into a W shape. The lower molarized premolars and molars are about half as wide as their upper counterparts. The lower cheek teeth's occlusal surfaces have patterns resembling two mesiodistal crescents with an outwards convex side. M_{3} has a hook-shaped and curved hypoconulid cusp. The non-molarized premolars have talonids (crushing regions of cheek teeth) that are only semi-developed as elongated ridges.

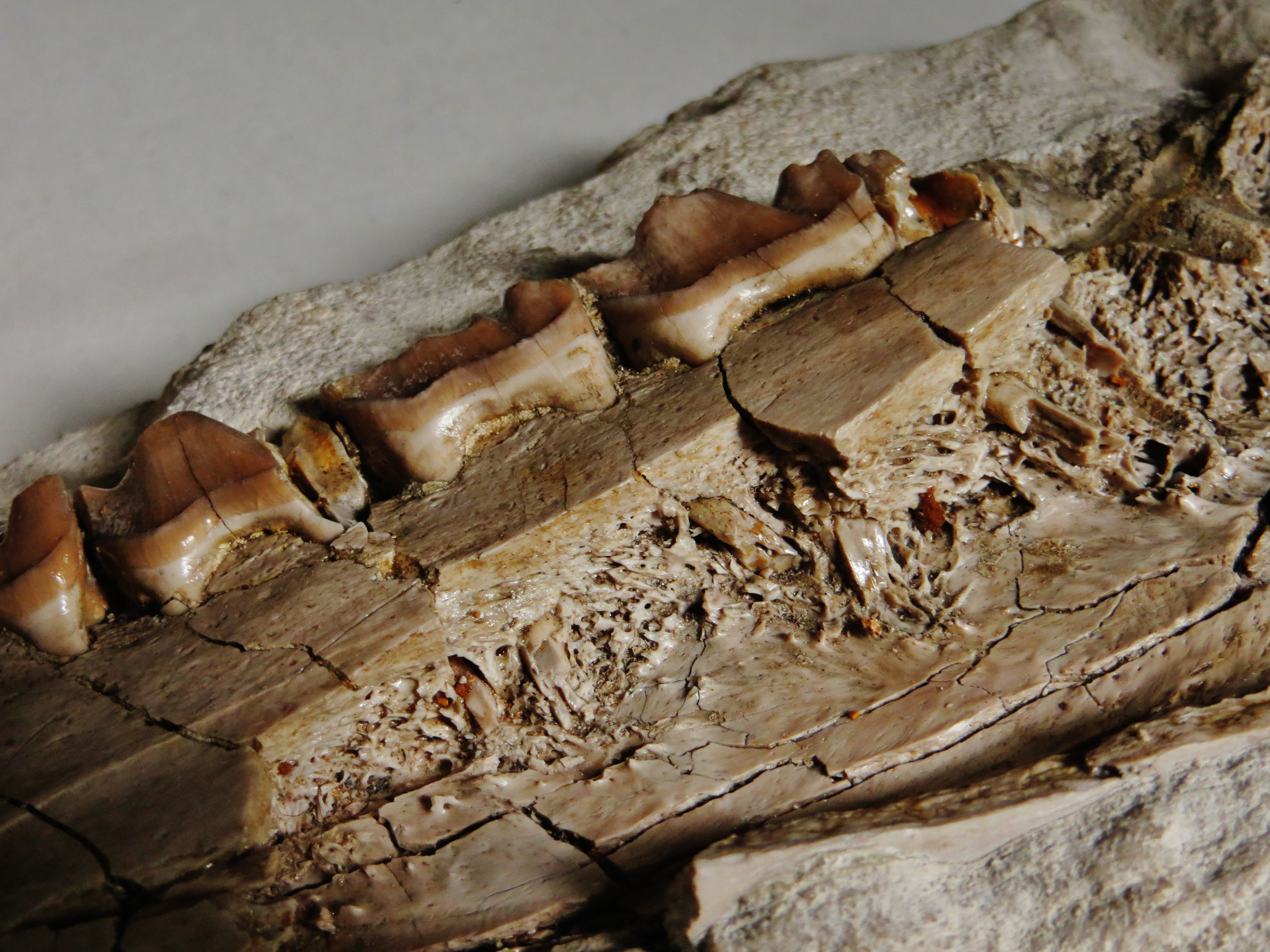
P. magnum dentition, Teylers Museum

The lingual side (back side in relation to the mouth) of the upper molars are at about the same heights at different stages of the teeth resulting from shifting stages in chewing. On the other hand, in regard to chewing stages, the crowns on the buccal side (front side of back teeth) of the upper molars increase in height and move forward. In the lower molars, the crowns instead shift the opposite way towards the buccal side. This is due to the chewing function being emphasized on the buccal side of the upper molars for shearing through food vertically and the lingual side of the lower molars for slowly chewing through food in a horizontal manner. A Palaeotherium individual would have moved its lower jaw in a circular movement, pushing forward the upper molars in a manner of occlusion during and after eruption, especially at their buccal side. The upper molars go through an abrasion process that causes their outer part of their crowns to curve. This ensures that the distance from the front cutting edge of the ectolophs to the axis of rotation remains the same. The emphasis on the buccal side for shearing in derived palaeotheres differs from that on both the buccal and lingual sides of the teeth in early equids.

Compared to the earlier-appearing pachynolophines, the palaeotheriines have more molarized deciduous premolars (dP). This trend is noticeable in multiple juvenile P. renevieri and P. magnum, which both have molariform, four-cusped dP^{2}-dP^{4}. However, both species have triangular dP^{1} that contain two buccal cusps (paracone and metacone cusps) and a smaller posterolingual cusp. Stehlin theorized that the dP^{1} tooth would not have been replaced by any adult P^{1} due to the similar sizes of the milk tooth to the adult tooth. While Remy proposed that an adult P^{1} had already replaced its deciduous counterpart in P. magnum at an early age, there is no strong evidence to support his claim.

== Postcranial skeleton ==
=== Vertebrae and ribs ===
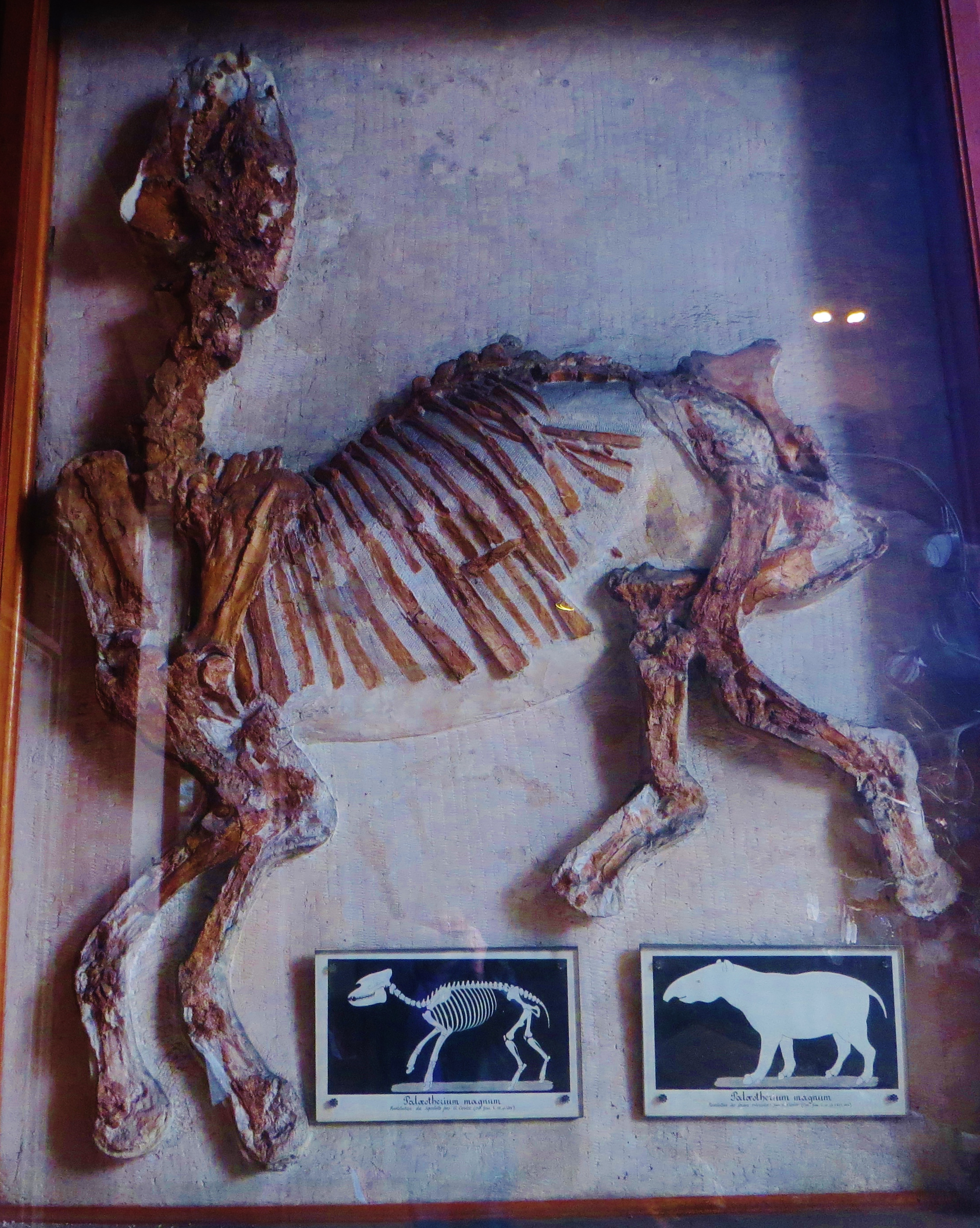
P. magnum skeleton from Vitry-sur-Seine, NMNH, France

The overall postcranial anatomy of Palaeotherium is best known from a skeleton of P. magnum uncovered from Mormoiron. Within the vertebral column are seven large-sized cervical vertebrae total for a series of C1-C7, typical of most mammals. In total, they measure 65 cm (26 in) long within the individual skeleton. The atlas (C1) was trapezoidal and closely resembled those of equids, but it differed from theirs in its transverse processes having less rounded outlines. The spiny process of the atlas of Palaeotherium is elongated and thin compared to those of horses. The proceeding cervical vertebrae, C2-C4, are wider than they are long and appear roughly quadrangular in shape. Their lateral process are proportionately wider than in horses but also decrease in length gradually from the front to the back. C7 has a well-pronounced spinous process more akin to tapirs than horses. Based on the anatomy of the cervical vertebrae, the neck of P. magnum is long and muscular but not low like in tapirs.

There are also seventeen thoracic vertebrae, one vertebra less than in horses and two less than in tapirs, that measure 77 cm (30 in) long in total. The first ten vertebrae, T1-T10, are about equal in individual lengths with each other but are slightly shorter than the last seven, T11-T17. The first thoracic vertebrae have strong spinous processes with few variations, but their lengths decrease as seen in T5-T6. The thoracic vertebrae generally have rectangular and elongated shapes, differing from the triangular and sequentially shorter spinous processes in horses. The arrangements of the thoracic vertebrae reveal that the withers (or scapula ridges) of P. magnum are lower than a horse's but higher than a tapir's.

Like horses, P. magnum also has six lumbar vertebrae measuring 65 mm (2.6 in) long, one more vertebra than that of donkeys, zebras, and tapirs. All the vertebrae have equal lengths and, especially L3, have strong lateral processes that furrow toward the back, widen to a third of their total lengths, slightly narrow, and then finally swell in the end. They differ from the nearly straight lateral process shapes of equids. The lumbar vertebrae portion of Palaeotherium was probably wider than that of the horse.

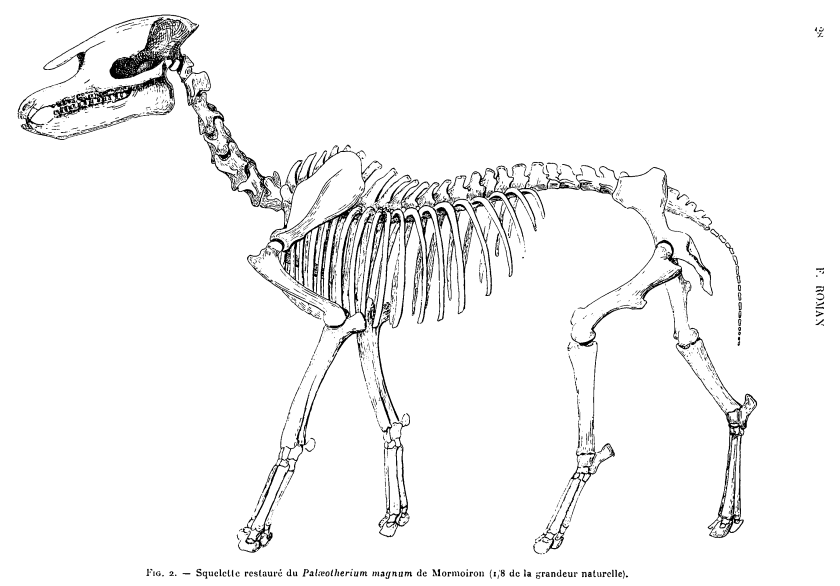
Drawing of a reconstructed skeleton of P. magnum based on that from Mormoiron, 1922

The sacrum, connected from its back underneath the pelvis, is triangular similar to that of the Equidae but is slightly wider in its front area. It appears to compose of six sacral vertebrae total. The final region of the vertebral column is composed of fifteen caudal vertebrae that compose the tail, although there is the possibility that one to two additional ones are hidden by the pelvis. The caudal vertebrae, especially in C5-C11, are slender due to their lengths being twice their widths. The first four, however, have roughly equal lengths and widths. The tail, in terms of length and vertebrae shape, is similar to that of equids. The skeleton's tail measures 35 cm (14 in) long, the first four vertebrae being 11 cm (4.3 in) long.

Although the Mormoiron skeleton has nineteen complete or fragmented ribs, P. magnum would have had thirty-four total based on the number of thoracic vertebrae. Like in equids, the front ribs are strong and flattened. One rib between the forelimbs, probably articulated at T10, measures 49 cm (19 in) long, suggesting that the rib cage size is larger than those of horses and approximate to those of modern rhinoceroses. The back portion of the thorax would have been wider than in horses and roughly comparable to those of tapirs and rhinoceroses but never being as long as those of the latter. The ribs sharing space with the sternum do not directly connect to it but are instead separated from it. The sternum is approximately the same size as the thorax. Contrary to the 1922 reconstruction by Roman, there is no evidence that the rib cage had a fan-shaped spread.

=== Limbs ===
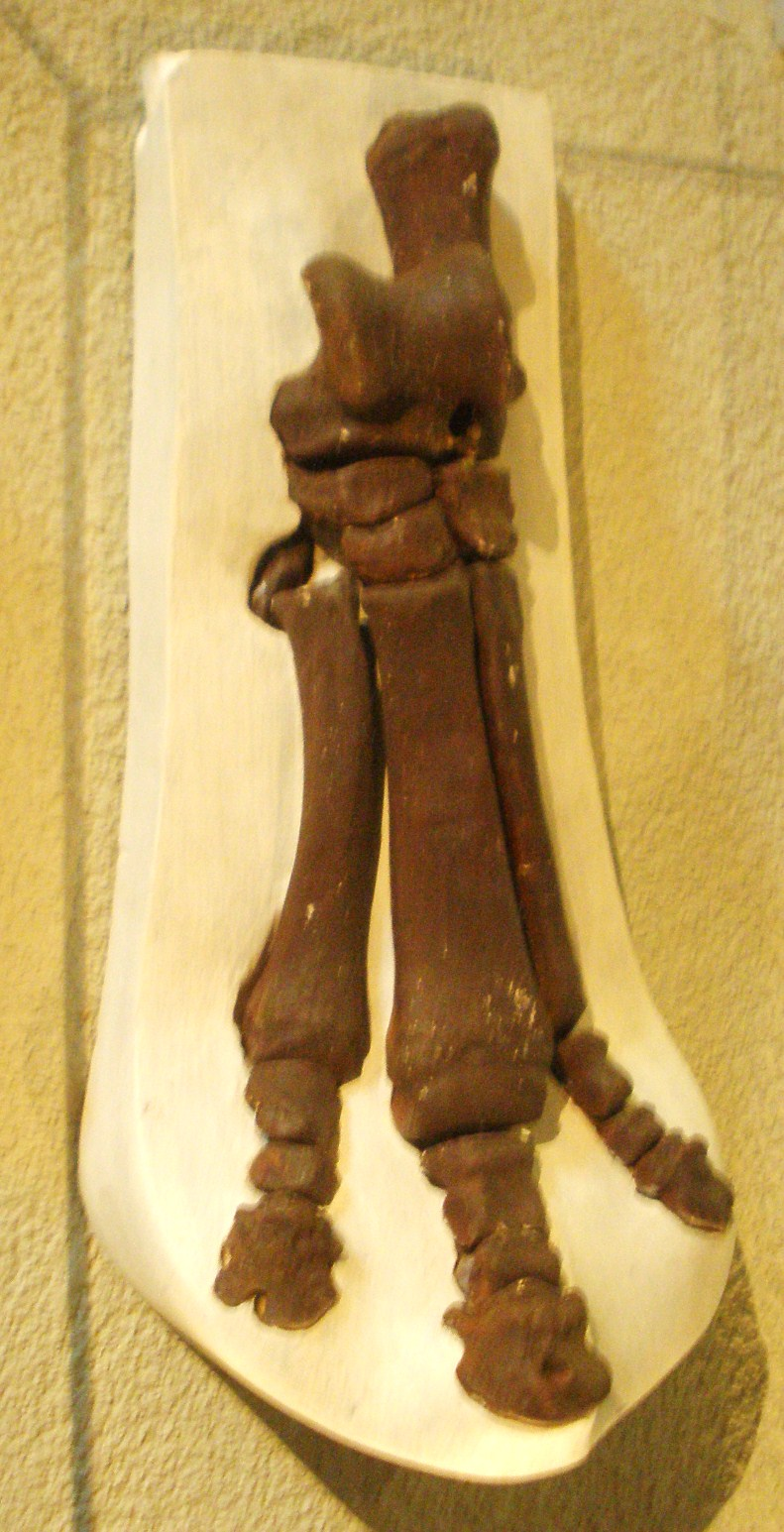
Front foot of P. crassum, Naturalis Biodiversity Center

The Palaeotheriidae includes both the primitive members with tetradactyl (four-toed) forelimbs plus tridactyl (three-toed) hindlimbs (Propalaeotherium) and more derived members with tridactyl forelimbs plus hindlimbs (Palaeotherium, Plagiolophus). Most species of Palaeotherium, most notably P. medium, P. magnum, P. crassum, P. curtum, and P. muehlbergi, have tridactyl limbs. It is unclear as to whether or not P. eocaenum is tetradactyl based on a possible manus tentatively assigned to it. Both the manus and pes bones are short plus robust. The side digits are capable of reaching the ground and are not much more slender than the middle one. While previous studies have suggested that modern tapirs serve as analogues for European perissodactyls of the Eocene, a 2020 study by Jame A. MacLaren and Sandra Naewelaerts suggested that no one species of tapir serves as an analogue for any of the extinct species. P. medium has a more unique foot morphology compared to other Palaeotherium species due to narrower plus higher feet and stretched metapodial bones. The tridactyl foot morphology with all three digits being functional suggests digitigrade locomotion.

In P. magnum, the morphology of the scapula, which articulates with the humerus, is similar to those in modern equids, giving off a narrow appearance due to its length being twice its width. Its highest point aligns with the transverse processes of the front thoracic vertebrae. It is elongated, nearly rectangular in shape, and slightly narrow at its base. Its glenoid fossa is concave plus shallow whereas its coracoid process articulates underneath the vertebral column. Compared to equids, the scapula, while similar, is more triangular while its glenoid fossa is deeper and more rounded.

The humerus' head articulates with the glenoid cavity of a scapula while its lower end connects with the forearm's bones. The head is slightly oblique, making it more similar to those of rhinoceroses than those of tapirs. The greater tubercle of the humerus appears long and narrow as in tapirs. The deltoid tuberosity is located about halfway along the humerus' length, slightly lower than in Anchitherium and modern horses. The humerus of P. medium is more slender. The lips of its trochlea (articular surface of the elbow joint) has a larger slope. The bicipital groove of the humerus, which separates the greater tubercle and lesser tubercle, is deep. The morphology of the humerus of P. medium implies more cursorial adaptations.

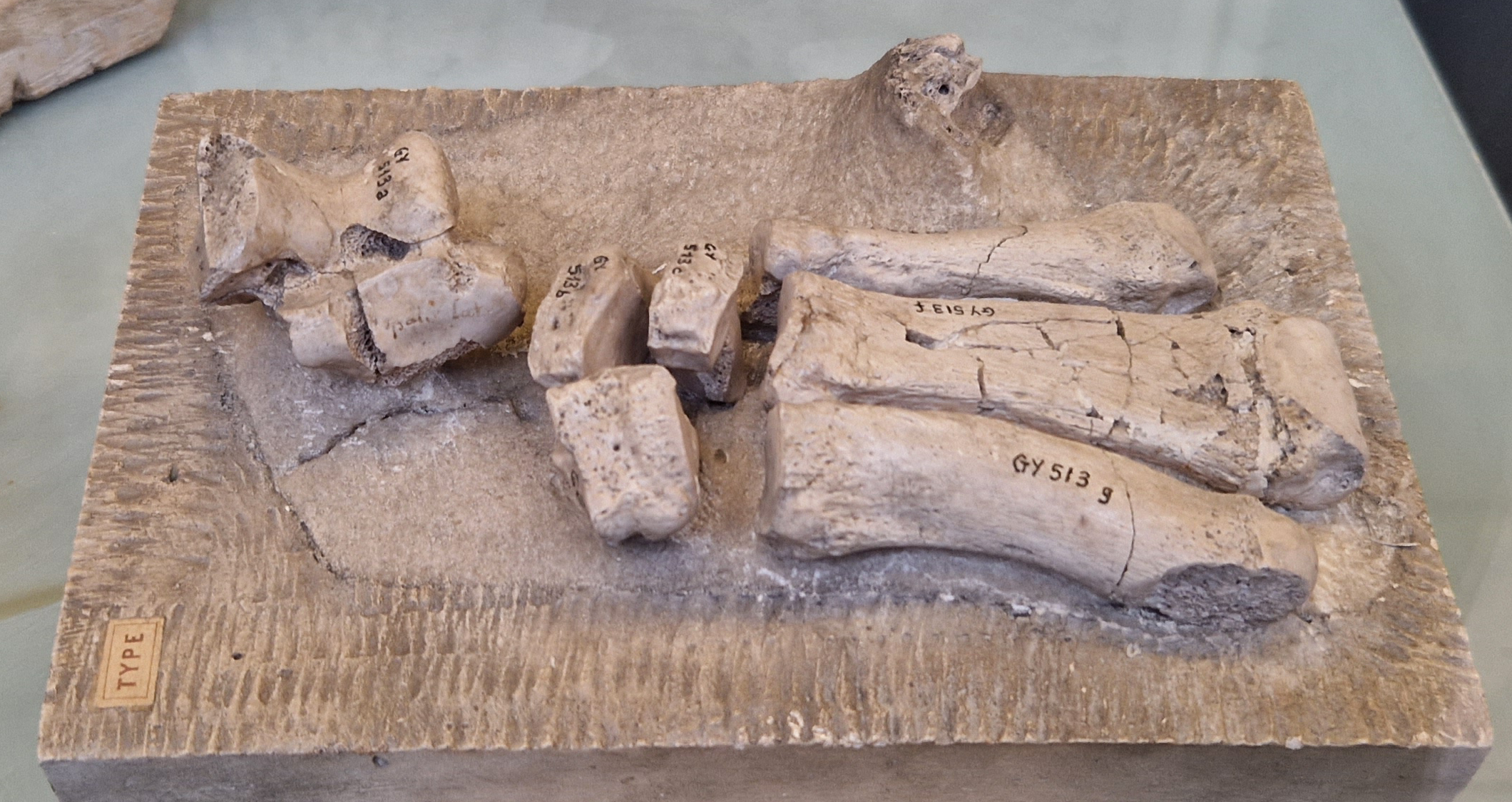
P. medium foot bones, MNHM, France

In P. magnum, the forearm, consisting of the radius and ulna, is 20% larger than the humerus. In comparison, tapirs have slightly longer humeri compared to the radius and ulna, and the forearm of horses are 25% larger than their humeri. The radius, articulated with the humerus and carpal bones, is slightly arched and has a roughly circular front end. The upper part of the radius is fused with the upper ulna. Its general shape appears similar to those of tapirs but is slightly thinner and has less prominent extremities. The ulna is well-developed and lengthy, being as strong as the radius and having a less pronounced back curvature compared to tapirs and horses. Its olecranon process is enlarged but is only slightly hollow in its internal face.

The palaeotheriines Palaeotherium and Plagiolophus, despite being known as tridactyl genera, display large morphological diversity of the forelimb. The former has long plus narrow carpals, its metacarpal bones being close in length to each other plus developing into wide ungual phalanges at their ends and the middle one being slightly more robust. Palaeotherium has an exceptional amount of shape variation displayed in its third metacarpal and varies in manus dimensions by species with known limb remains. P. curtum has very robust forelimb bones including a stocky and stocky manus, which suggests that it was stocky in build. P. magnum and P. crassum are suggested to have forelimbs that to at least some level resemble those of tapirs, especially the mountain tapir (Tapirus pinchaque). The forelimb morphology of P. magnum rather than P. crassum may more closely resemble those of tapirs to the more gracile forms of the radius and metacarpals in the latter. P. medium, along with Plagiolophus spp, appear to be the most cursorial palaeotheres due to their elongated and gracile metacarpals; those of P. medium and Plagiolophus are of approximately equal proportional lengths.

In the Mormoiron skeleton, the femur is strong and stocky, its upper (or proximal) end being enlarged and having a large trochanter (or femoral tubercle) that does not extend beyond the size of the femoral head. On the external face of the bone, here is a third trochanter that is well-developed, triangular in shape, and barely curved forward. Its position is slightly more centred compared to that of P. medium. The bone narrows slightly after the third trochanter then swells quickly.

The tibia, like other limb bones, is strong and thick in build, its front crest reaching the midlength of the bone. It hosts a shallow front fossa for the patella, differing from the deeper ones of Anchitherium and Equus. Its joint end for the astragalus is somewhat oblique, and the tibia's malleolus is less developed compared to the aforementioned equids. The fibula is slender in form and fused to the tibia. It is proportionally wider in P. magnum than in P. crassum and P. medium, the latter two species of which have lesser-developed ones.

Palaeotherium has a straighter and less concave trochlea of the astragalus than in Plagiolophus. The calcaneum is semirectangular in shape and is slightly wide on its back end. The cuboid bone is high and narrow similar to that in Anchitherium. As in the metacarpal bones, the middle metatarsal bone (finger III) is larger and more well-developed than the others. Finger IV of the hind foot of P. magnum appears slightly arched and is slightly longer than finger II.
