= Cervix (disambiguation) =

A cervix or collum is a neck, that is, a narrowed region of an object (such as a body or a body part). In anatomy, various body parts are called necks, predominantly:

- Neck, the narrowed region of the body between the torso and the head
- Uterine cervix, usually just called the cervix when the context is implicit

Further examples of body parts by that name are:

- Cervix vesicae urinariae, the neck of the urinary bladder
- Cervix cornus dorsalis medullae spinalis or cervix cornus posterioris medullae spinalis, the neck of the posterior grey column (the posterior horn of the spinal cord)
- Cervix dentis, the neck of a tooth (a slightly narrowed area where the crown meets the root, such as on a molar tooth)
- Cervix (insect anatomy), a membrane that separates the head from the thorax in insects

== See also ==
- Neck (disambiguation)
- Collum (disambiguation)
