= Collum fracture =

A collum fracture (collum is Latin for "neck") may refer to:

- A humerus fracture of the surgical neck of the humerus or, less frequently, the anatomical neck of the humerus.
- A hip fracture of the femur neck
