= Collum humeri =

Collum humeri is Latin for neck of humerus, and may refer to:

- Anatomical neck of humerus
- Surgical neck of the humerus
