= Neck of the humerus =

Neck of the humerus may refer to:

- Surgical neck of the humerus
- Anatomical neck of humerus
