= Neck (disambiguation) =

The neck is the body part between the head and torso of many animals.

Neck may also refer to:

== Other uses in anatomy ==
=== Bones ===
- Femur neck, part of the femur bone
- Surgical neck of the humerus
- Anatomical neck of humerus
- Neck of the malleus, part of the ear
- Neck of a rib
- Neck of the scapula
- Neck of the talus

=== Organs ===
- Neck of the gallbladder
- Neck of the pancreas
- Neck of the urinary bladder

== Arts and entertainment ==
- Neck (band), a British Celtic punk band
- Neck (film), a 2010 Japanese film
- Neck (music), part of certain string instruments and woodwind instruments
- Talkin' Out the Side of Your Neck, a 1984 single by Cameo also known as "Neck"
- "Neck" (short story), by Roald Dahl
- Necks (EP), by Thunderbirds Are Now!, 2005
- The Necks, an Australian jazz trio

== Places ==
- Neck, Netherlands
- Neck City, Missouri, United States

== Other uses ==
- Another term for a Peninsula
- Necking (engineering), tensile deformation forming a neck
- Neck (Chinese constellation), in Chinese astronomy
- Neck (water spirit), in Germanic mythology and folklore
- Volcanic neck or plug, a volcanic landform

== See also ==
- The Neck (disambiguation)
- Hermann Necke (1850–1912)
- Necking (disambiguation)
- Neck of the Woods (disambiguation)
- Cervix (Latin, 'neck')
- Isthmus (Ancient Greek, 'neck')
- Collum (disambiguation)
- Neck violin, a punishment method from the Middle Ages
