= Cullom =

Cullom may refer to:

- Cullom (surname), a surname
- Cullom, Illinois, a village in Livingston County, Illinois, United States

== See also ==
- Collum (disambiguation)
- Cullum (disambiguation)
