= Cullom (surname) =

Cullom is a surname. Notable people with the surname include:

- Alvan Cullom (1797–1877), American politician
- Alvan Cullom Gillem Jr. (1888–1973), American army general
- Jim Cullom (1925–1998), American football player
- Philip Hart Cullom (born 1957), former United States Navy admiral
- Shelby M. Cullom (1829–1914), American politician
- Shelby Cullom Davis (1909–1994), American businessman and diplomat
- Shelby M.C. Davis (Shelby Moore Cullom Davis) (born 1937), American philanthropist
- William Cullom (1810–1896), American politician

== See also ==
- Collom
- Collum
- Cullum (surname)
