= Columella =

Columella, meaning little column, may refer to:

== People ==
- Lucius Columella, a 1st-century CE Roman writer on agriculture

== Biology ==
- Columella (bone), a part of the auditory system of amphibians, reptiles and birds
- Columella (botany), an axis of sterile tissue which passes through the center of the spore-case of mosses and a cellular layer near the tip of a plant's root cap
- Columella (gastropod), an anatomical feature of a coiled snail or gastropod shell
- Columella (genus), a genus of land gastropods in the family Vertiginidae
- Columella (plant), a cultivar of Dutch elm
- Columella nasi, the fleshy external end of the nasal septum
- In corals, the central axis structure of a corallite formed by the inner ends of the septa

== Other uses ==
- Columella (wine), a wine label by South African producer The Sadie Family
- Columella; or, The Distressed Anchoret, a 1779 novel by Richard Graves

== See also ==
- Collum (disambiguation)
- Column (disambiguation)
