= Medial bicipital groove =

Anatomy of upper arm

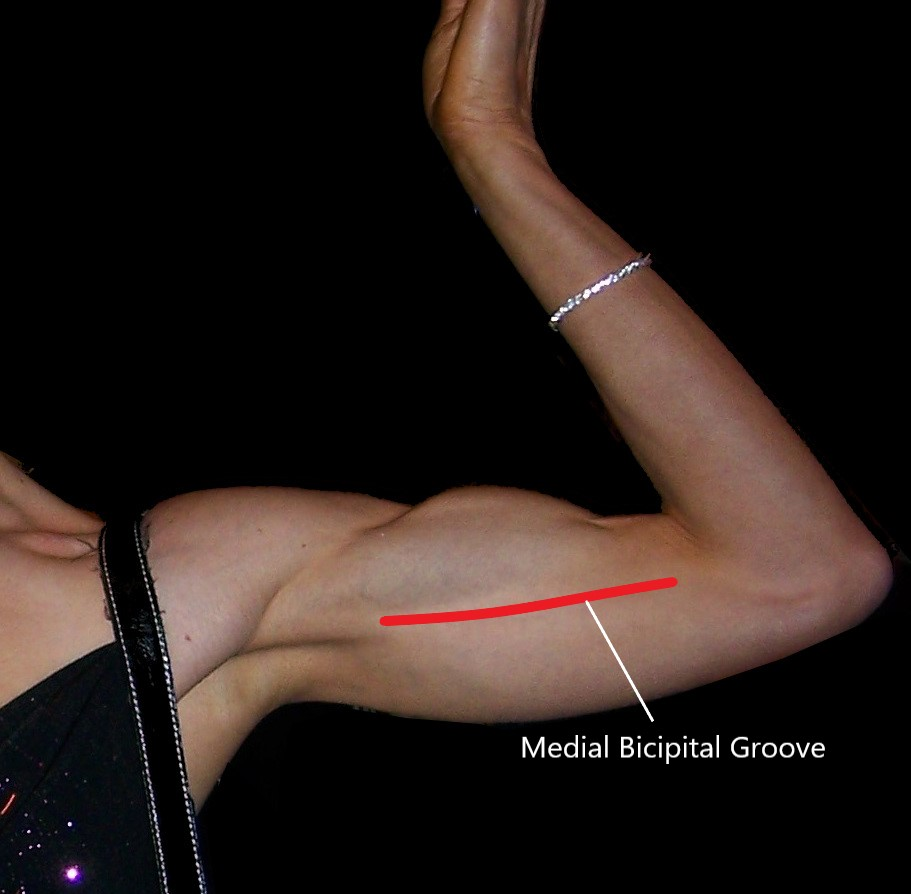
Picture of a flexed arm in medial view. Medial Bicipital Groove visible between postero-medial border of the short head of biceps brachii and anteromedial border of long head of triceps brachii

The medial bicipital groove is seen on the surface anatomy of the upper arm. It is formed by the longitudinal hollow between the biceps and triceps muscles.

The pulse of the brachial artery can be felt in the medial bicipital groove.

It should be distinguished from the bicipital groove or intertubercular sulcus, which is not a surface anatomy structure. It is the groove where the long head of biceps tendon runs between the greater and lesser tubercles below the humeral head before inserting into the superior glenoid rim.

The lateral bicipital groove is seen on the lateral aspect of the upper arm, and is formed by the same anatomical structures as the medial groove.

The contents of the Medial Bicipital Grove include the Median Nerve, the Ulnar Nerve, Brachial Artery and Brachial Vein.
