= Thorax (arthropod anatomy) =

Body part of an arthropod

The thorax is the midsection (tagma) of the hexapod body (insects and entognathans). It holds the head, legs, wings and abdomen. It is also called mesosoma or cephalothorax in other arthropods.

It is formed by the prothorax, mesothorax and metathorax and comprises the scutellum; the cervix, a membrane that separates the head from the thorax; and the pleuron, a lateral sclerite of the thorax.

In dragonflies and damselflies, the mesothorax and metathorax are fused together to form the synthorax.

In some insect pupae, like the mosquitoes', the head and thorax can be fused in a cephalothorax.

Members of suborder Apocrita (wasps, ants and bees) in the order Hymenoptera have the first segment of the abdomen fused with the thorax, which is called the propodeum. The head is connected to the thorax by the occipital foramen, enabling a wide range of motion for the head.

In most flying insects, the thorax allows for the use of asynchronous muscles.

The thorax in various types of insect

In Heteroptera

In Diptera

In Formicidae
