= Columnar (disambiguation) =

Columnar (or epithelium) is a type of epithelial cell.

Columnar may also refer to:

- Columnar cacti, a descriptive term for smaller cacti
- Columnar database, a type of database which stores data tables by column rather than by row
- Columnar disposition, a technique in encryption
- Columnar jointing, a geological structure shaped as a regular array of polygonal prisms
  - Columnar basalt, a type of rock formed during the cooling of a thick lava flow
- Columnar Peak, a subsidiary peak of Mount Garibaldi, British Columbia, Canada
- Columnar phase, a class of floating crystals which can exist in a cylindrical shape
- Columnar Valley, a valley in Victoria Land, eastern Antarctica

== See also ==
- Column (disambiguation)
- Columnaria, an extinct genus of rugose coral
- Columnarios, silver coins that were minted by Spain from 1732 to 1773
- Columnaris, a symptom of disease in fish caused by the Flavobacterium columnare bacterium
