= Thomas Cullum =

Thomas Cullum may refer to:

- Thomas Gery Cullum (1741–1831), English doctor
- Sir Thomas Cullum, 1st Baronet (circa 1587 – 1664), of the Cullum baronets
- Sir Thomas Cullum, 2nd Baronet (1628 – 1680), of the Cullum baronets
- Sir Thomas Gery Cullum, 8th Baronet (1777 – 1855), of the Cullum baronets

== See also ==
- Cullum (surname)
