= The Neck =

The Neck may refer to:

- The Neck, Newfoundland and Labrador, Canada
- The Neck, Philadelphia, Pennsylvania, United States
- The Neck, New Zealand, an isthmus in Central Otago
- The Neck on Skomer, Pembrokeshire, Wales
- The Neck (British Columbia), Canada

== See also ==
- Neck (disambiguation)
- The Necks, an experimental jazz trio from Sydney, Australia
