= Collum (surname) =

Collum is a surname. Notable people with the surname include:

- Herbert Collum (1914–1982), German organist, harpsichordist, composer, and conductor
- Hugh Collum (1940–2005), British businessman
- Jackie Collum (born 1927), American Major League Baseball pitcher
- Jason Paul Collum (born 1973), American film maker
- John Collum (1926–1962), American actor
- Vera Collum (1883–1957), British journalist, suffragist, anthropologist, photographer, radiographer and writer
- Willie Collum (born 1979), Scottish football referee

== See also ==
- Cullum (surname)
- Collum (disambiguation)
