= Cullum =

Cullum may refer to:

- Cullum (surname), a surname
- Cullum, Mississippi, unincorporated community in Kemper County, Mississippi, United States
- Cullum Mansion, historic mansion in Carthage, Tennessee, United States
- Cullum baronets, extinct baronetcy in the Baronetage of England
- Cullum Welch, British Army officer, businessman, and member of the City of London Corporation

== See also ==
- Collum (disambiguation)
- Cullom (disambiguation)
