= Necking =

Necking can refer to:

- Making out, a term for heavy kissing of the neck or petting of that area
- Necking (engineering), the process by which a ductile material deforms under tension forming a thin neck
- Necking (electronics), thinning of traces in PCB layouts
- Necking, a behavior of giraffes
- Necking up or necking down, methods of modifying a firearm cartridge to make a wildcat cartridge or a new production cartridge (e.g. the US .60 caliber T17 round being shortened and necked up to create the 20×102 mm M61 Vulcan cannon cartridge)

== See also ==
- Neck (disambiguation)
- Rubbernecking
