= Cullum (surname) =

Cullum is a surname. Notable people with the surname include:

- Albert Cullum (1921–2003), American educator
- Ben Cullum (born 1977), British musician
- George Washington Cullum (1809–1892), American Civil War general and Superintendent of the U.S. Military Academy
- JD Cullum (born 1966), American actor
- Jamie Cullum (born 1979), English pianist and songwriter
- Jim Cullum (1898–1948), Australian rules footballer
- Jim Cullum Jr. (1941–2019), American cornetist and bandleader
- John Cullum (born 1930), American actor and singer
- Kimberly (born 1981) and Kaitlin Cullum, American former child actors who are also sisters
- Leo Cullum (1942–2010), American cartoonist, father of Kimberly and Kaitlin Cullum
- Ridgwell Cullum (1867–1943), British writer of adventure novels
- Robert B. Cullum (1912–1981), American businessman and civic leader
- Thomas Cullum, multiple people
  - Thomas Gery Cullum (1741–1831), medical doctor, botanist, and antiquary

== See also ==
- Collum (surname)
- Cullum (disambiguation)
