= Column (disambiguation) =

A column is a vertical structural element in architecture.

Column or columns may also refer to:

== Art and entertainment ==
- Column (periodical), a recurring piece or article in a newspaper or magazine
- "Columns" (How I Met Your Mother), a 2007 episode of How I Met Your Mother
- Columns (video game), a puzzle video game

== Computing, informatics and mathematics ==
- Column (data store), a NoSQL object
- Column (database), a set of data values of a particular type in a relational database
- Column(s) in a table (information), a data arrangement with rows and columns
- Column vector, an m × 1 matrix in linear algebra
- Miller Columns, the data tree structure visualization technique

== Military ==
- Column (formation), a military formation
- Flying column, a combined arms independent military formation of a temporary nature

== Science ==
- Column (botany) or gynostemium, a part of an orchid
- Column chromatography, a method used to purify individual chemical compounds from mixtures of compounds
- Column-based nucleic acid purification
- Cortical column, a group of neurons in the brain cortex
- Fractionating column, an essential item used in distillation of liquid mixtures
- Packed bed column, an apparatus used in column chromatography, absorption, scrubbing and distillation
- Stalagnate (or pillar or sinter column), a limestone cave formation comprising a column from the ceiling to the floor
- Vertebral column, a column of vertebrae situated in the dorsal aspect of the abdomen
- Column (fluid dynamics), a vertical body of one fluid moving through another
  - Eruption column, a cloud of super-heated material suspended in gases after a volcanic eruption

== Other uses ==
- Columns (juggling), a juggling pattern
- Column (typography), a vertical block of text positioned on a page
- Columns of Gediminas, one of the earliest symbols of Lithuania and its historical coats of arms.
- Fifth Column, group of people who undermine a larger group, city or nation

== See also ==
- Collum (disambiguation), a neck or neck-like structure, also a surname
- Columnar (disambiguation)
- Column groups and row groups
- Help:Columns
- Template:Column
- Template:Columns-list
