= Surgical neck of the humerus =

Part of one of the bones of the arm

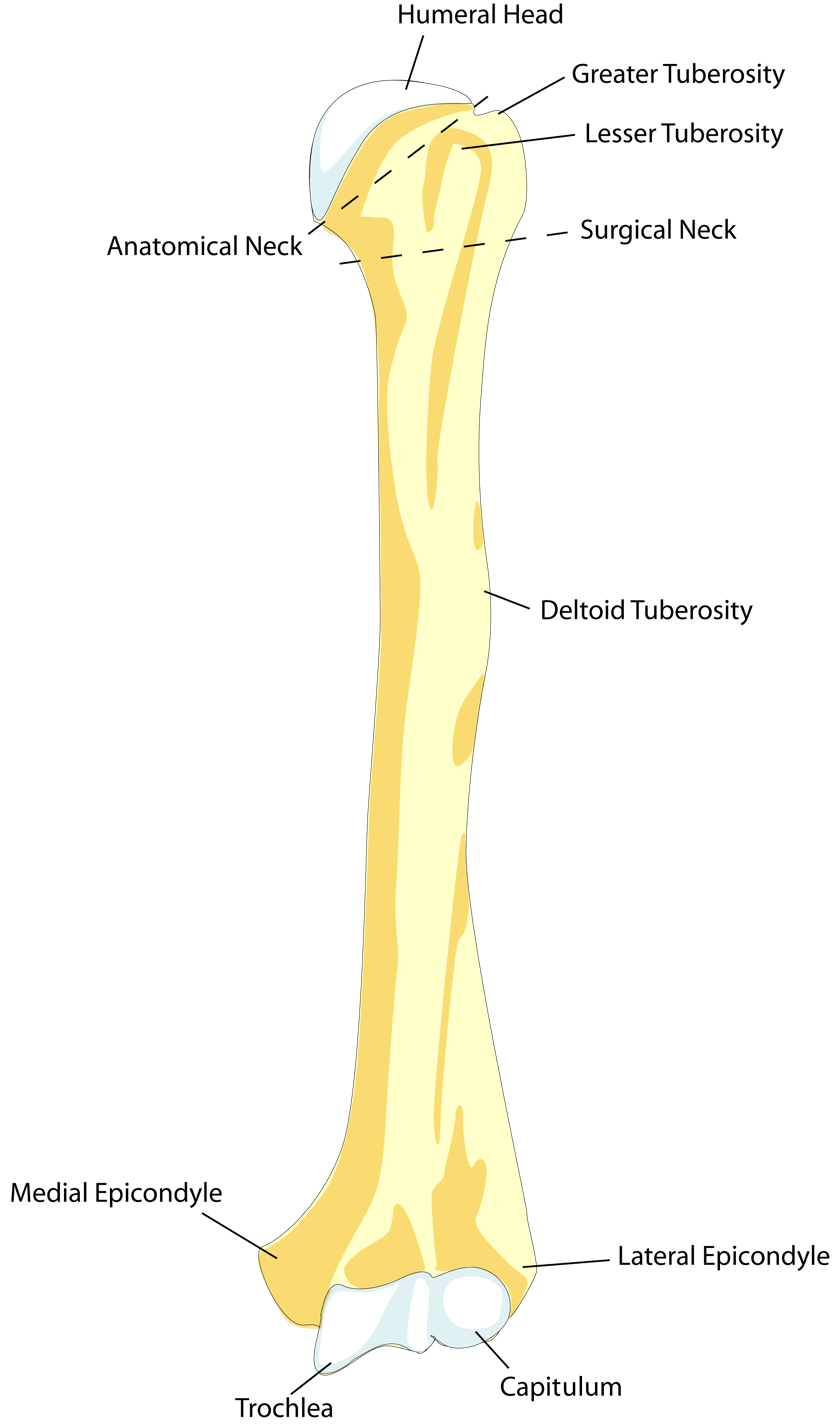
- Left humerus. Anterior view. (Surgical neck labeled at upper right.)

Details

Identifiers
- Latin: collum chirurgicum humeri
- TA98: A02.4.04.004
- TA2: 1183
- FMA: 23359

The surgical neck of the humerus is a bony constriction at the proximal end of shaft of humerus. It is situated distal to the greater tubercle and lesser tubercle, and proximal to the deltoid tuberosity.

== Clinical significance ==
The surgical neck is much more frequently fractured than the anatomical neck of the humerus. This type of fracture takes place when the humerus is forced in one direction while the joint capsule and the rotator cuff muscles remain intact. A fracture in this area is most likely to cause damage to the axillary nerve and posterior circumflex humeral artery. Damage to the axillary nerve affects function of the teres minor and deltoid muscles, resulting in loss of abduction of arm (from 15-90 degrees), weak flexion, extension, and rotation of shoulder as well as loss of sensation of the skin over a small part of the lateral shoulder.

== Additional images ==
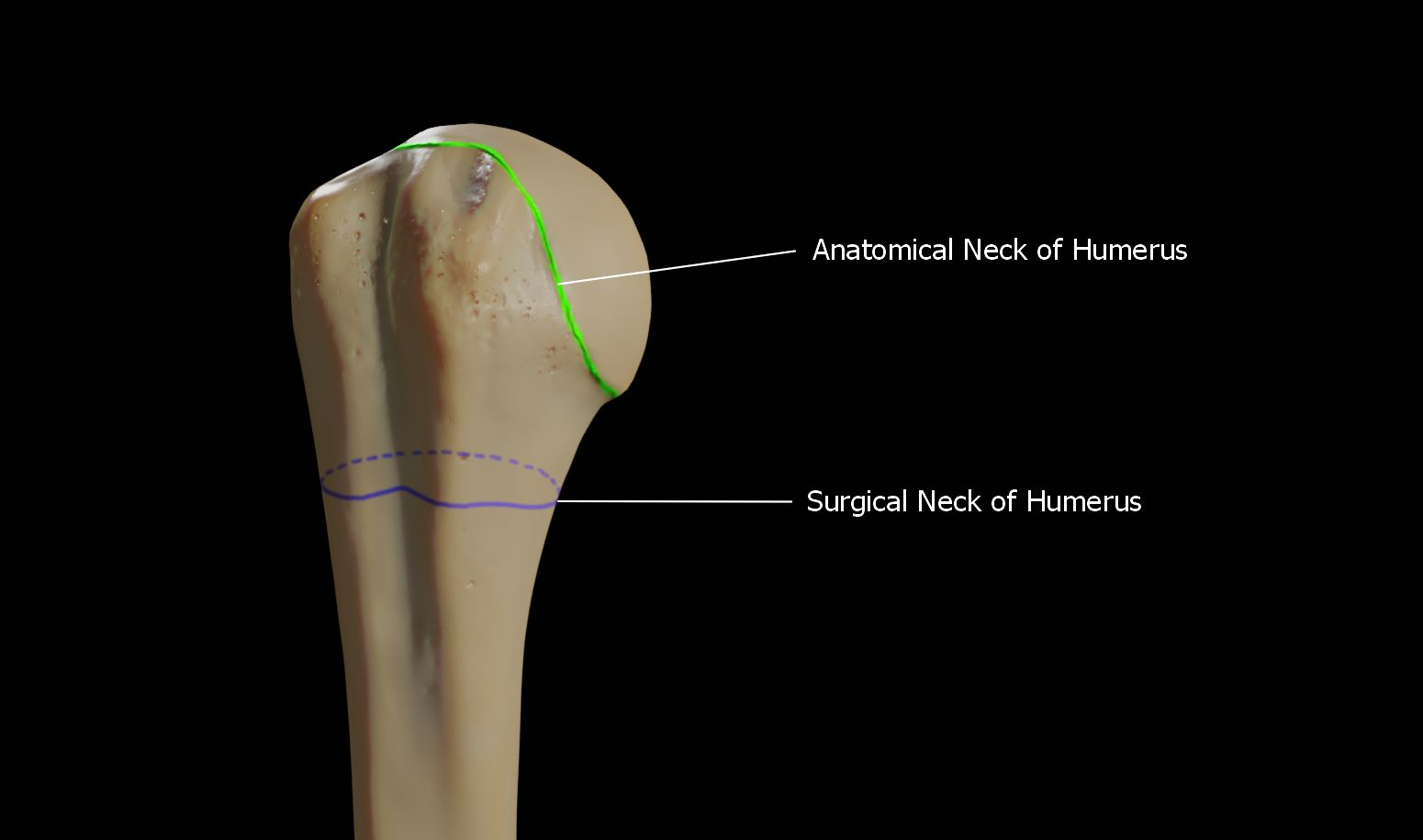
The difference between anatomical neck and surgical neck of the humerus

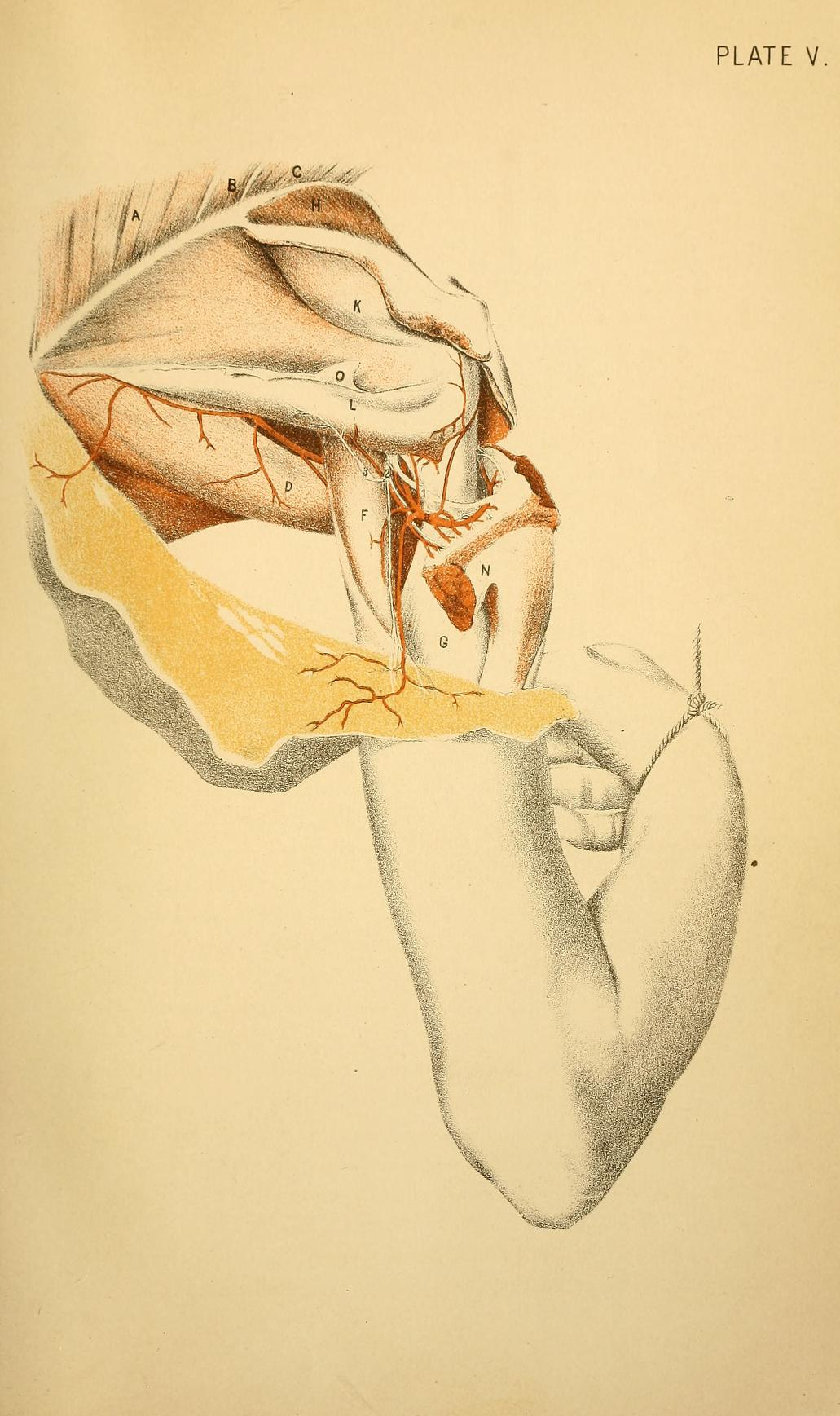
Posterior view of the humerus showing the axillary nerve and posterior circumflex humeral artery at the surgical neck.

== See also ==
- Quadrangular space
- Anatomical neck of the humerus
