= Collum =

Collum may refer to:

- Collum, the Latin term for neck
- Collum (millipedes), the first segment behind the head of millipedes
- Collum (surname), a surname

== See also ==
- Columella (disambiguation)
- Column (disambiguation)
- Cervix (disambiguation)
- Neck (disambiguation)
- Collum (disambiguation)
- Cullum (disambiguation)
- Cullom (disambiguation)
