= Neck of the Woods (disambiguation) =

Neck of the Woods is a 2012 album by Silversun Pickups.

Neck of the Woods may also refer to:

- Neck of the Woods (Daniel Herskedal and Marius Neset album), 2012
- "Neck of the Woods", a song by Birdman from the 2005 album Fast Money
- "Neck Of The Woods", a song by Maisie Peters from the 2021 soundtrack of Trying: Season 2
