= Cervix (insect anatomy) =

In insects, a membrane that separates the head from the thorax

The cervix in insects is a membrane that separates the head from the thorax and is composed of structures from both of these. A pair of lateral cervical sclerites are embedded in the cervix.
