= Bicipital groove =

Groove in the humerus bone

Bicipital
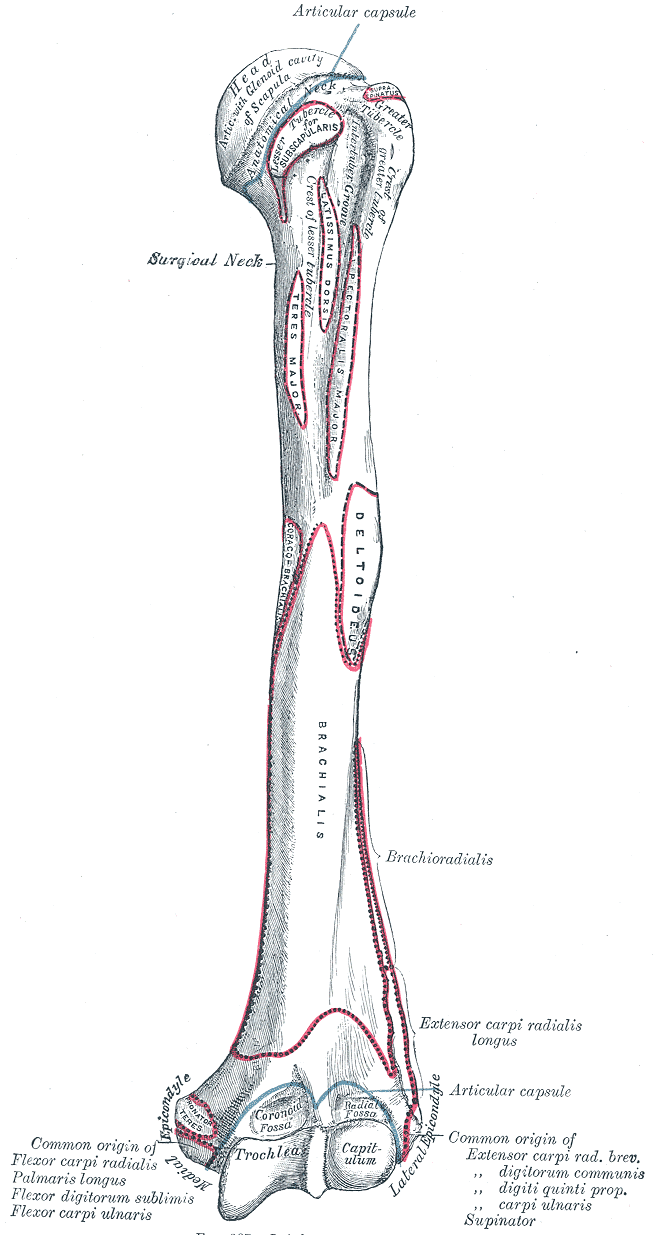
- Left humerus. Anterior view. (Intertubercular groove visible at top.)

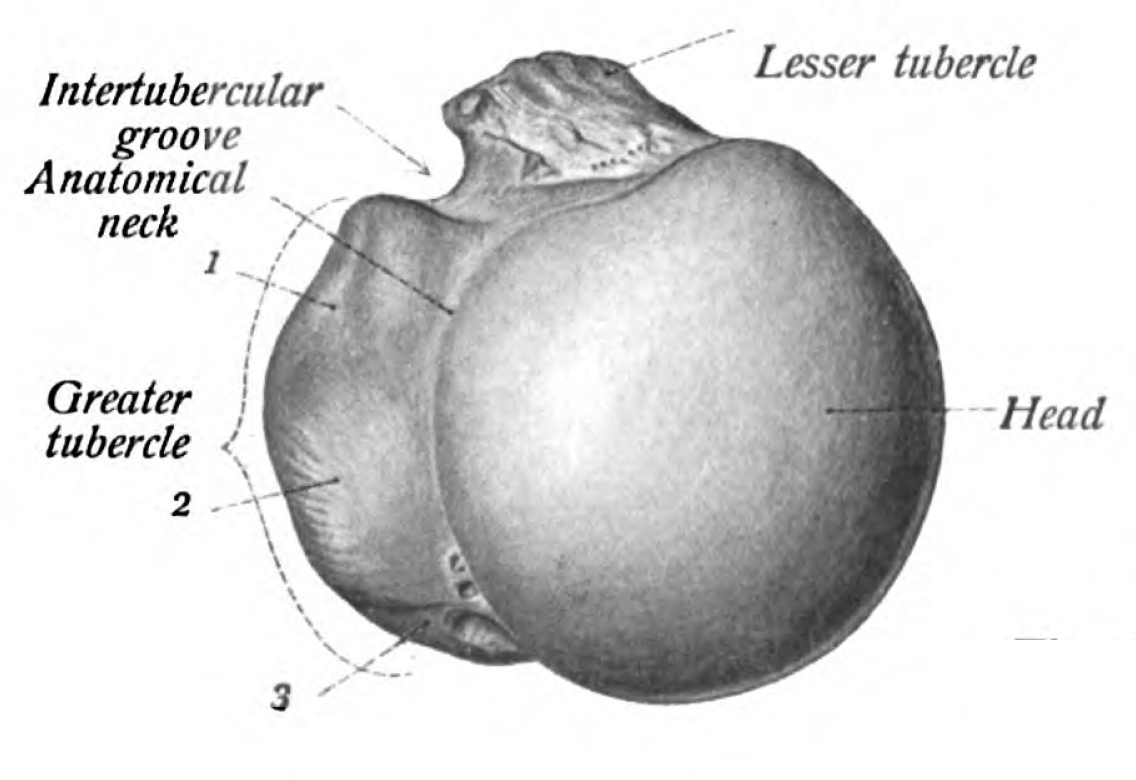
- intertubercular groove, upper left.

Details

Identifiers
- Latin: sulcus intertubercularis
- TA98: A02.4.04.007
- TA2: 1186
- FMA: 23396

The bicipital groove (intertubercular groove, sulcus intertubercularis) is a deep groove on the humerus that separates the greater tubercle from the lesser tubercle. It allows for the long tendon of the biceps brachii muscle to pass.

== Structure ==
The bicipital groove separates the greater tubercle from the lesser tubercle. It is usually around 8 cm long and 1 cm wide in adults. The groove lodges the long tendon of the biceps brachii muscle, positioned between the tendon of the pectoralis major muscle on the lateral lip and the tendon of the teres major muscle on the medial lip. It also transmits a branch of the anterior humeral circumflex artery to the shoulder joint.

The insertion of the latissimus dorsi muscle is found along the floor of the bicipital groove. The teres major muscle inserts on the medial lip of the groove.

It runs obliquely downward, and ends near the junction of the upper with the middle third of the bone. It is the lateral wall of the axilla.

== Function ==
The bicipital groove allows for the long tendon of the biceps brachii muscle to pass.

== Gallery ==
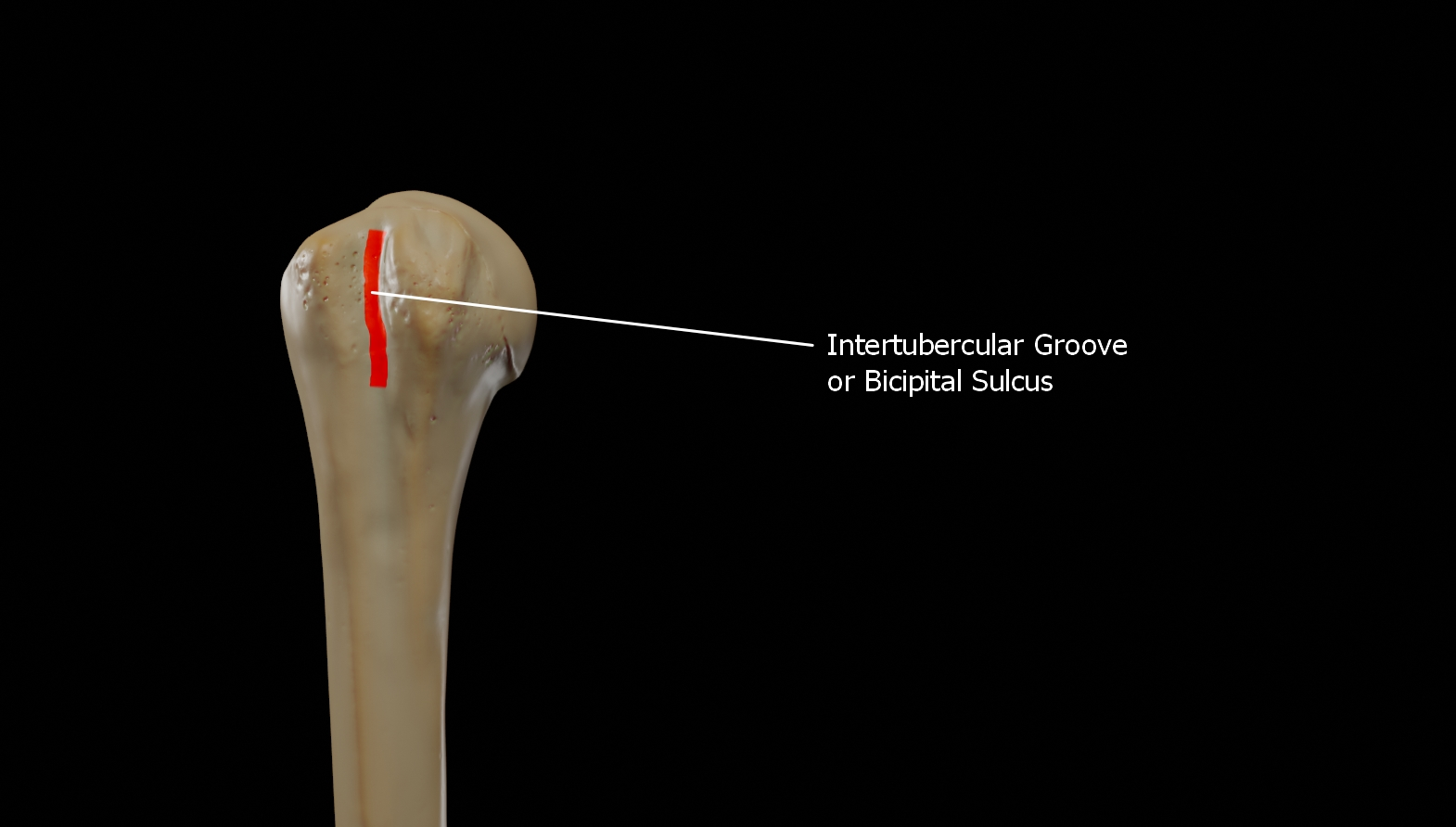
Bicipital groove of right humerus

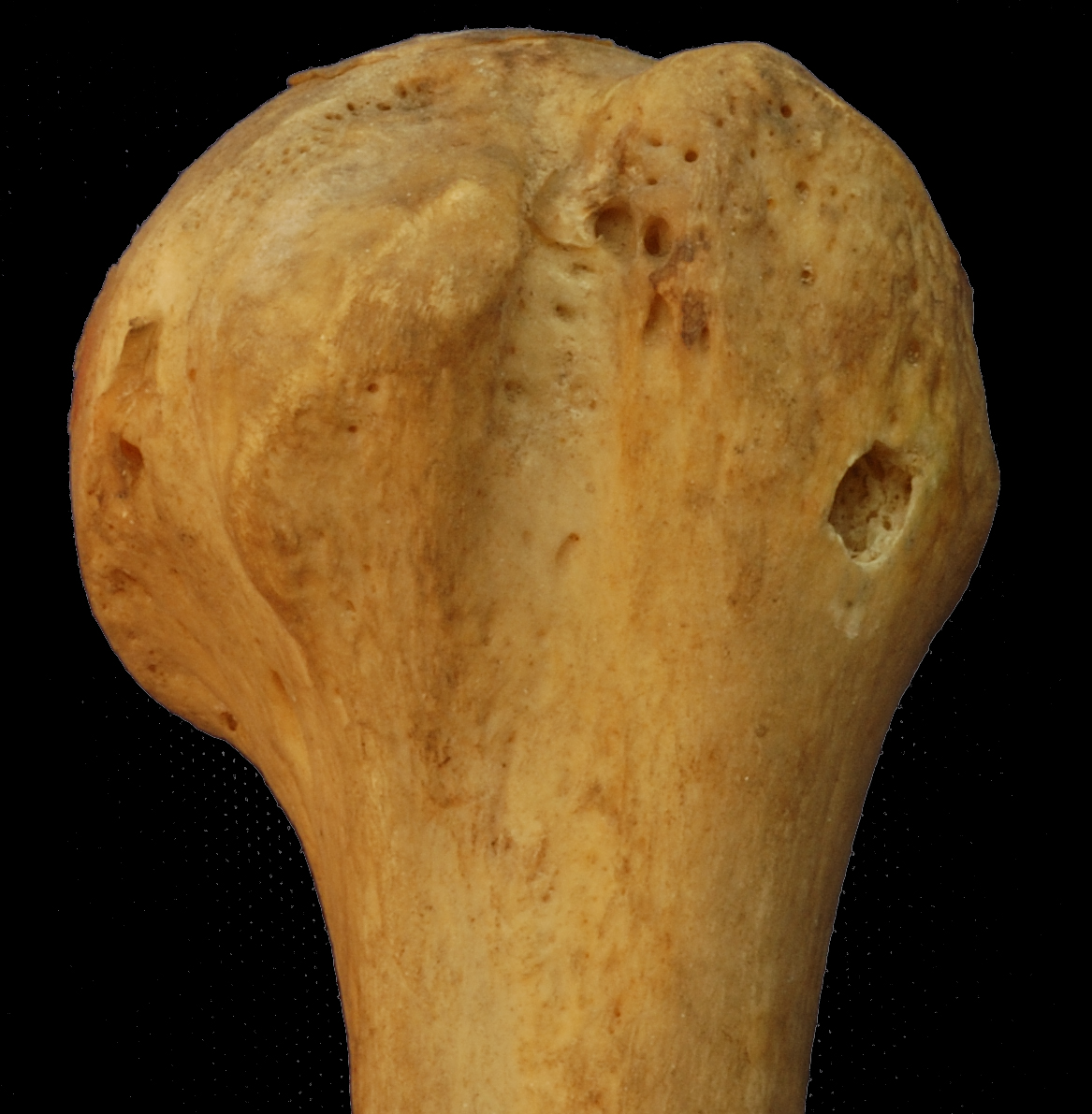
Anterior view of the head of left humerus. Bicipital groove seen in the middle.

== See also ==
- Radial groove
- Medial bicipital groove
