= Lesser tubercle =

Bony projection on the proximal end of the humerus

The lesser tubercle of the humerus, although smaller, is more prominent than the greater tubercle: it is situated in front, and is directed medially and anteriorly.

The projection of the lesser tubercle is anterior from the junction that is found between the anatomical neck and the shaft of the humerus and easily identified due to the intertubercular sulcus (Bicipital groove).

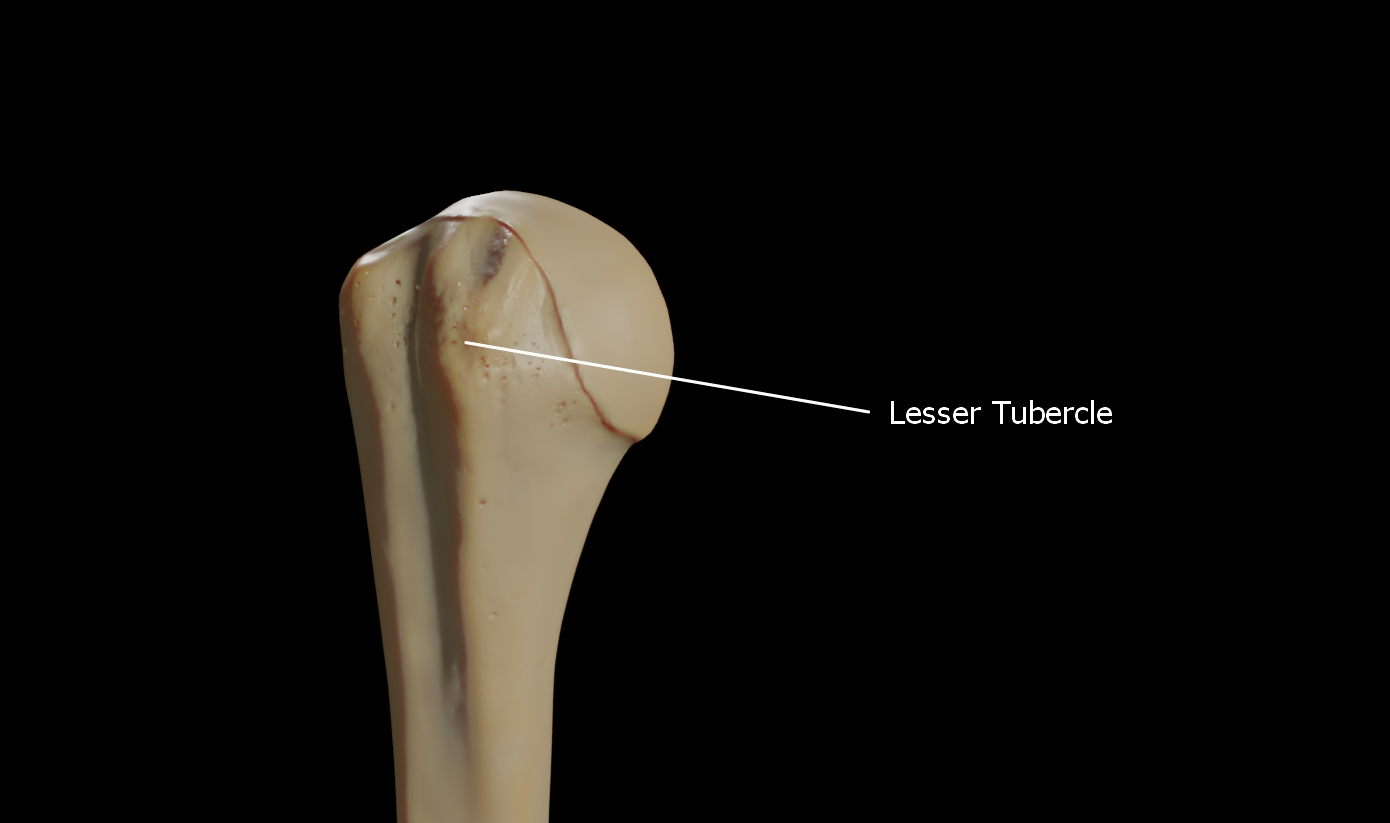
Lesser tubercle of right humerus

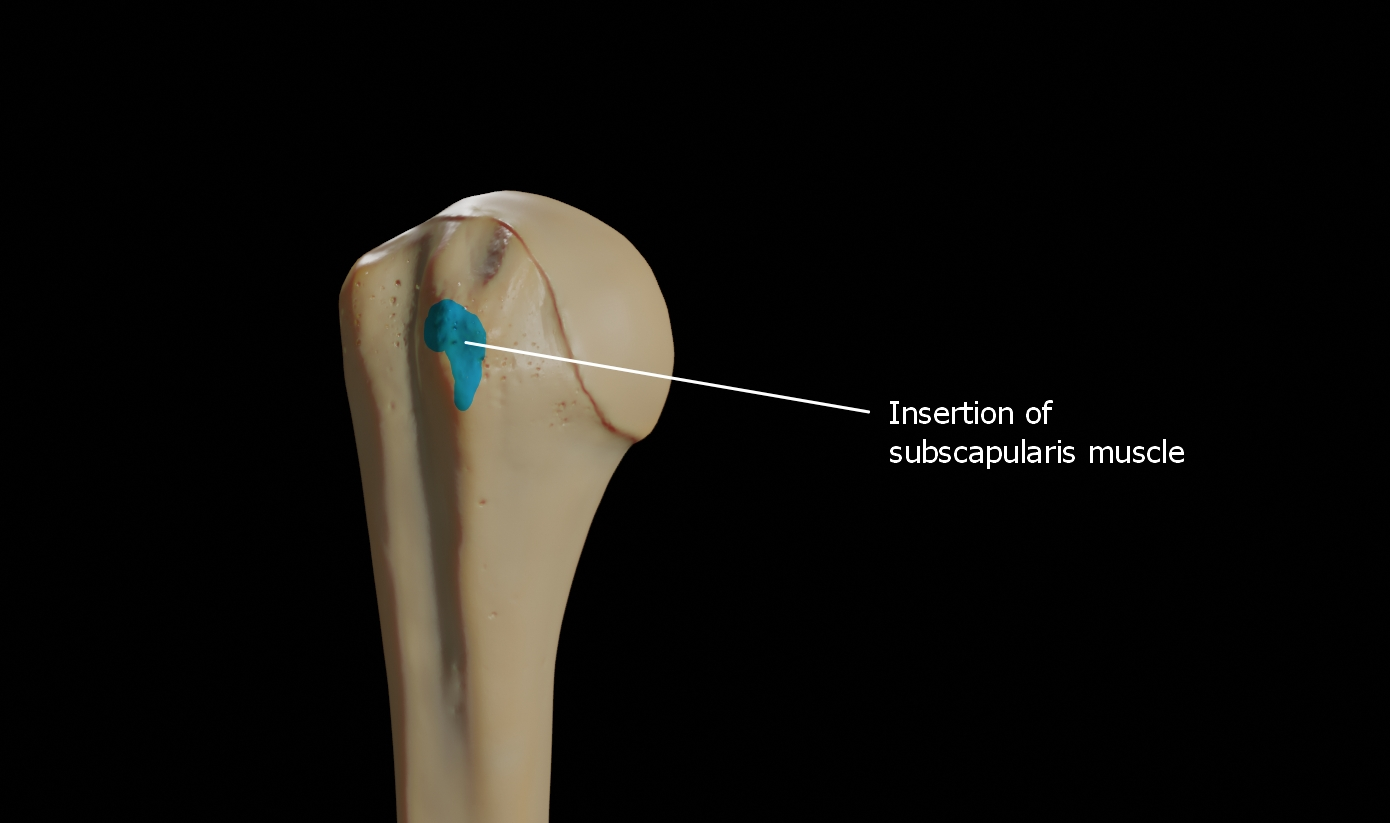
Insertion of subscapularis muscle

Above and in front it presents an impression for the insertion of the tendon of the subscapularis.

== Additional images ==
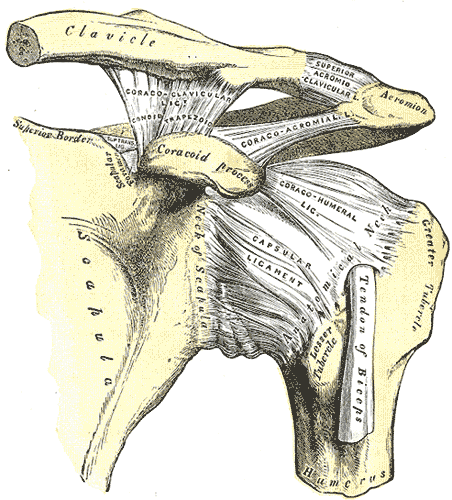
The left shoulder and acromioclavicular joints, and the proper ligaments of the scapula.

Human arm bones diagram
