= Greater tubercle =

Bony projection on the proximal end of the humerus

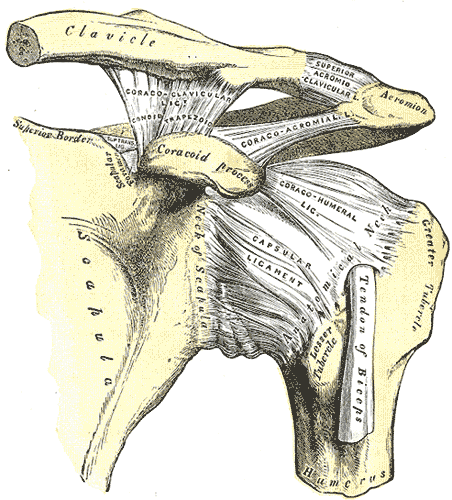
- Left humerus. Anterior view. (Greater tubercle visible at right.)

Details

Identifiers
- Latin: tuberculum majus humeri
- TA98: A02.4.04.005
- TA2: 1184
- FMA: 23390

The greater tubercle of the humerus is the outward part the upper end of that bone, adjacent to the large rounded prominence of the humerus head. It provides attachment points for the supraspinatus, infraspinatus, and teres minor muscles, three of the four muscles of the rotator cuff, a muscle group that stabilizes the shoulder joint. In doing so the tubercle acts as a location for the transfer of forces from the rotator cuff muscles to the humerus.

== Structure ==
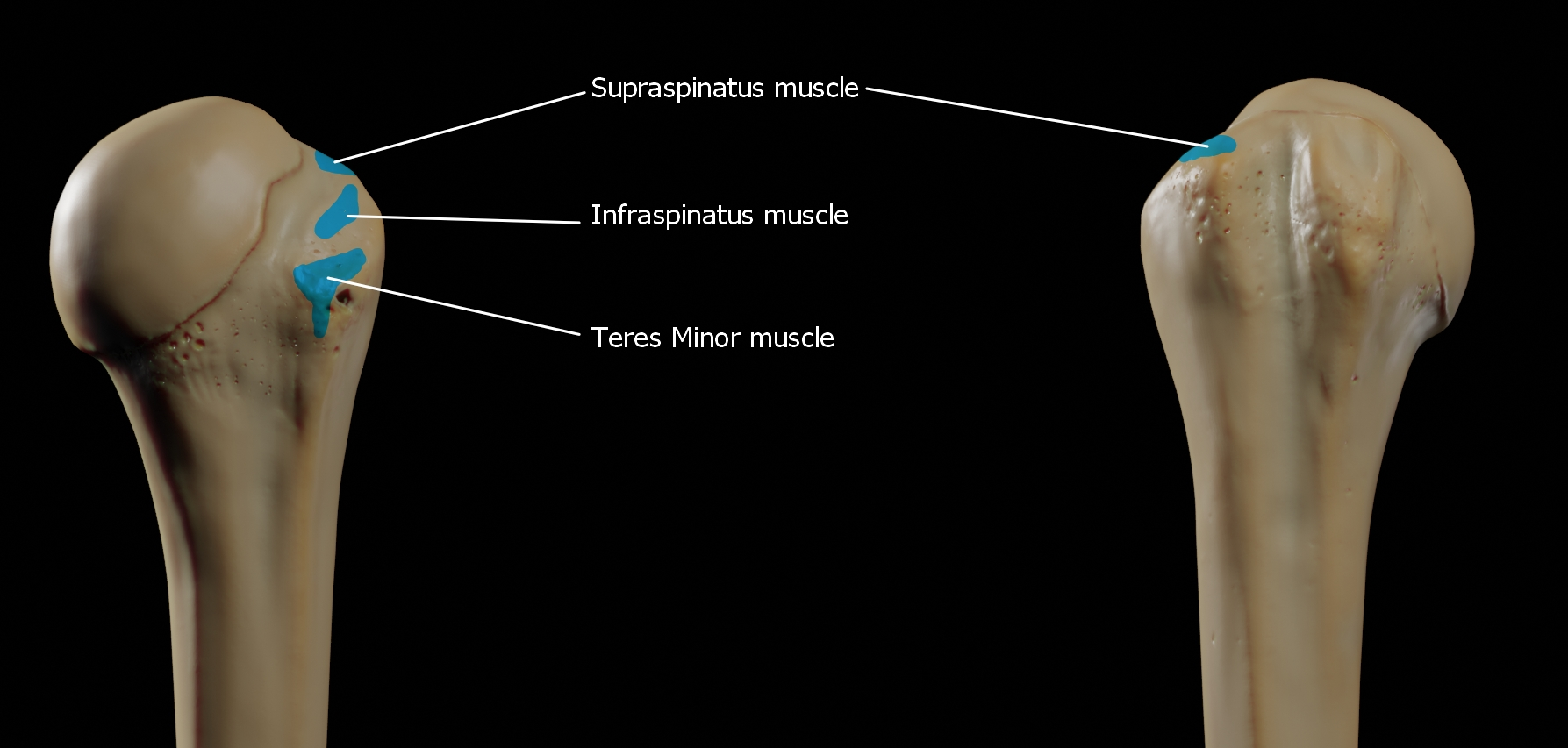
Attachments of greater tubercle

The upper surface of the greater tubercle is rounded, and marked by three flat impressions:

- the highest ("superior facet") gives insertion to the supraspinatus muscle.
- the middle ("middle facet") gives insertion to the infraspinatus muscle.
- the lowest ("inferior facet"), and the body of the bone for about 2.5 cm, gives insertion to the teres minor muscle.

The lateral surface of the greater tubercle is convex, rough, and continuous with the lateral surface of the body of the humerus. It can be described as having a cranial and a caudal part.

Between the greater tubercle and the lesser tubercle is the bicipital groove (intertubercular sulcus).

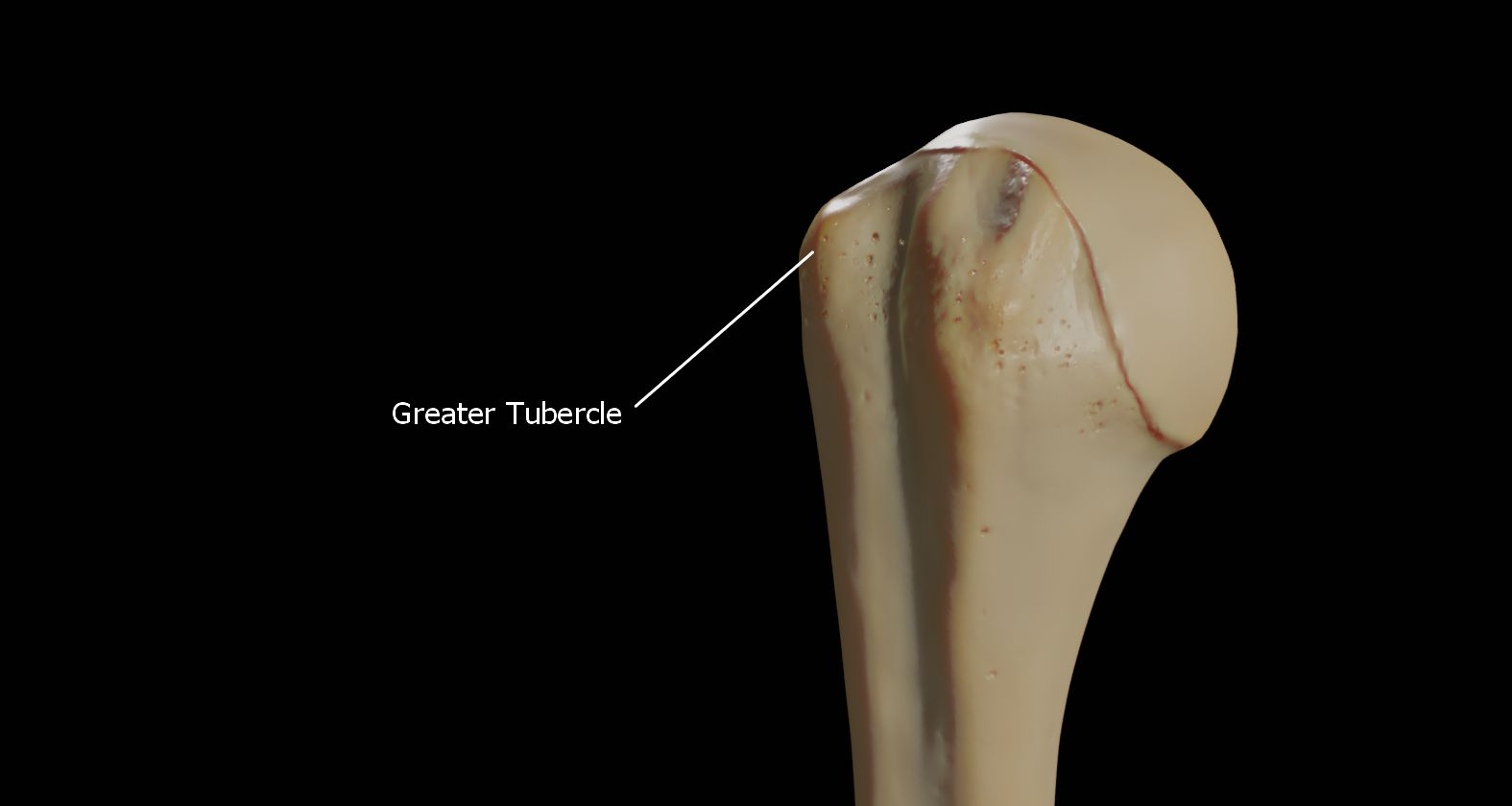
Rear view of the greater tubercle of right humerus

== Function ==
All three of the muscles that attach to the greater tubercle are part of the rotator cuff, a muscle group that stabilizes the shoulder joint. The greater tubercle therefore acts as a location for the transfer of forces from the rotator cuff muscles to the humerus.

The fourth muscle of the rotator cuff (subscapularis muscle) does not attach to the greater tubercle, but instead attaches to the lesser tubercle.

== Clinical significance ==
The greater tubercle is usually the easiest part of the humerus to palpate. It can be a useful surface landmark during surgery.

Frractures of the greater tuberosity can occur following anterior shoulder dislocations or as the result of an impact injury against the acromion or superior glenoid.

== Additional images ==
Human arm bones diagram
