= Anatomical neck of humerus =

Obliquely directed, forming an obtuse angle with the body of the humerus

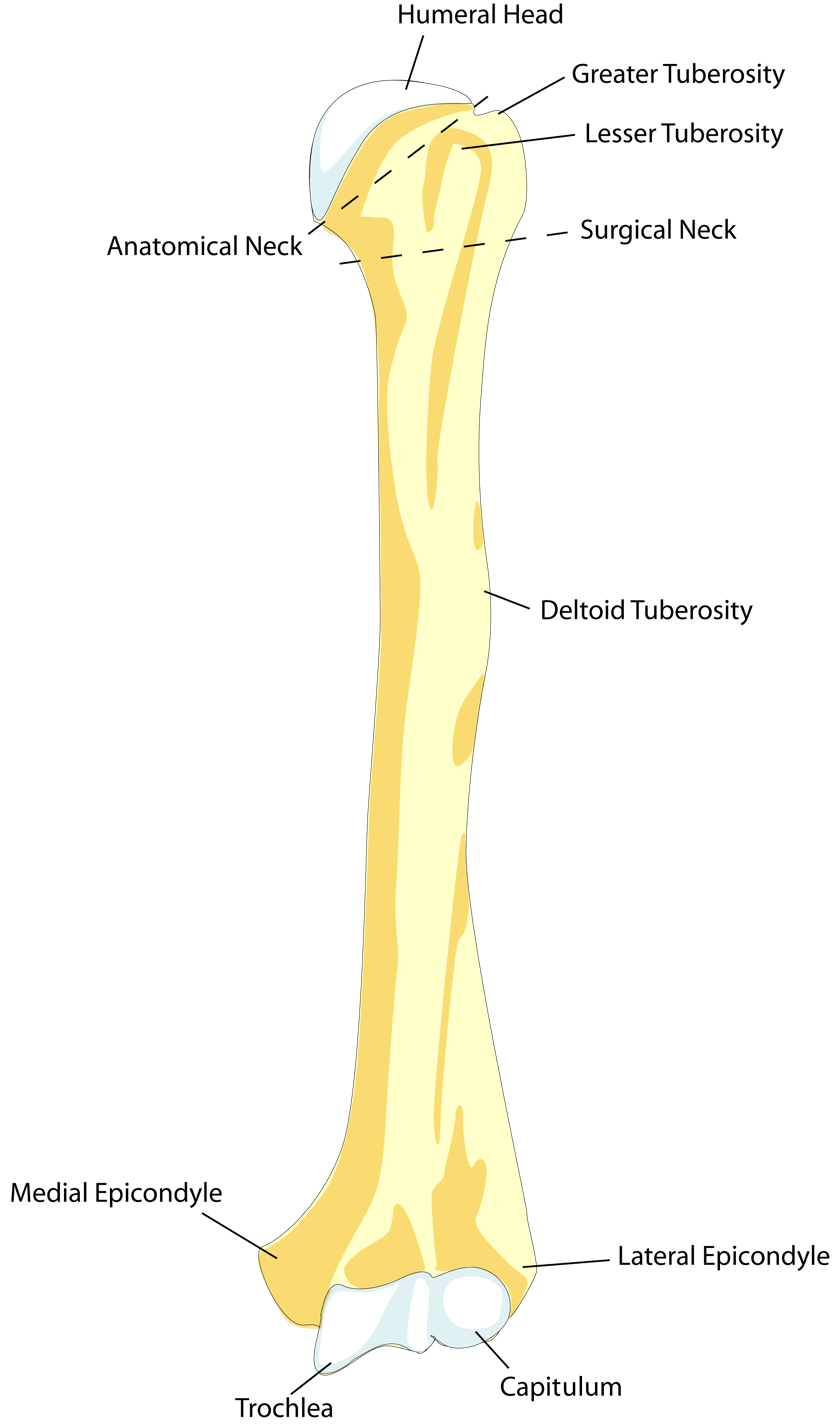
- Left humerus seen from the front (anatomical neck labeled at upper left).

Details

Identifiers
- Latin: collum anatomicum humeri
- TA98: A02.4.04.003
- TA2: 1182
- FMA: 23356

The anatomical neck of the humerus is obliquely directed, forming an obtuse angle with the body of the humerus. It represents the fused epiphyseal plate.

== Structure ==
The anatomical neck divides the head of the humerus from the greater and lesser tubercles of the humerus. It gives attachment to the capsular ligament of the shoulder joint except at the upper inferior-medial aspects. It is best marked in the lower half of its circumference; in the upper half it is represented by a narrow groove separating the head of the humerus from the two tubercles, the greater tubercle and the lesser tubercle. It affords attachment to the articular capsule of the shoulder-joint, and is perforated by numerous vascular foramina.

== Additional images ==
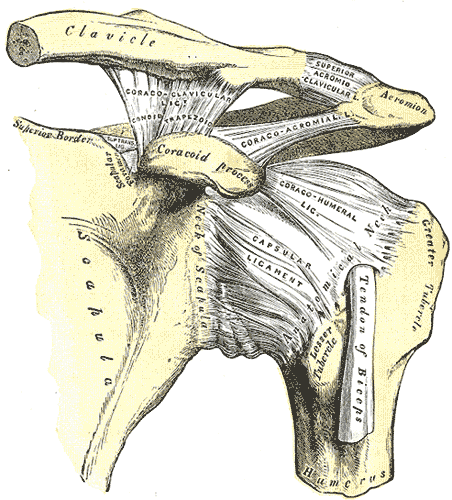
The left shoulder and acromioclavicular joints, and the proper ligaments of the scapula.

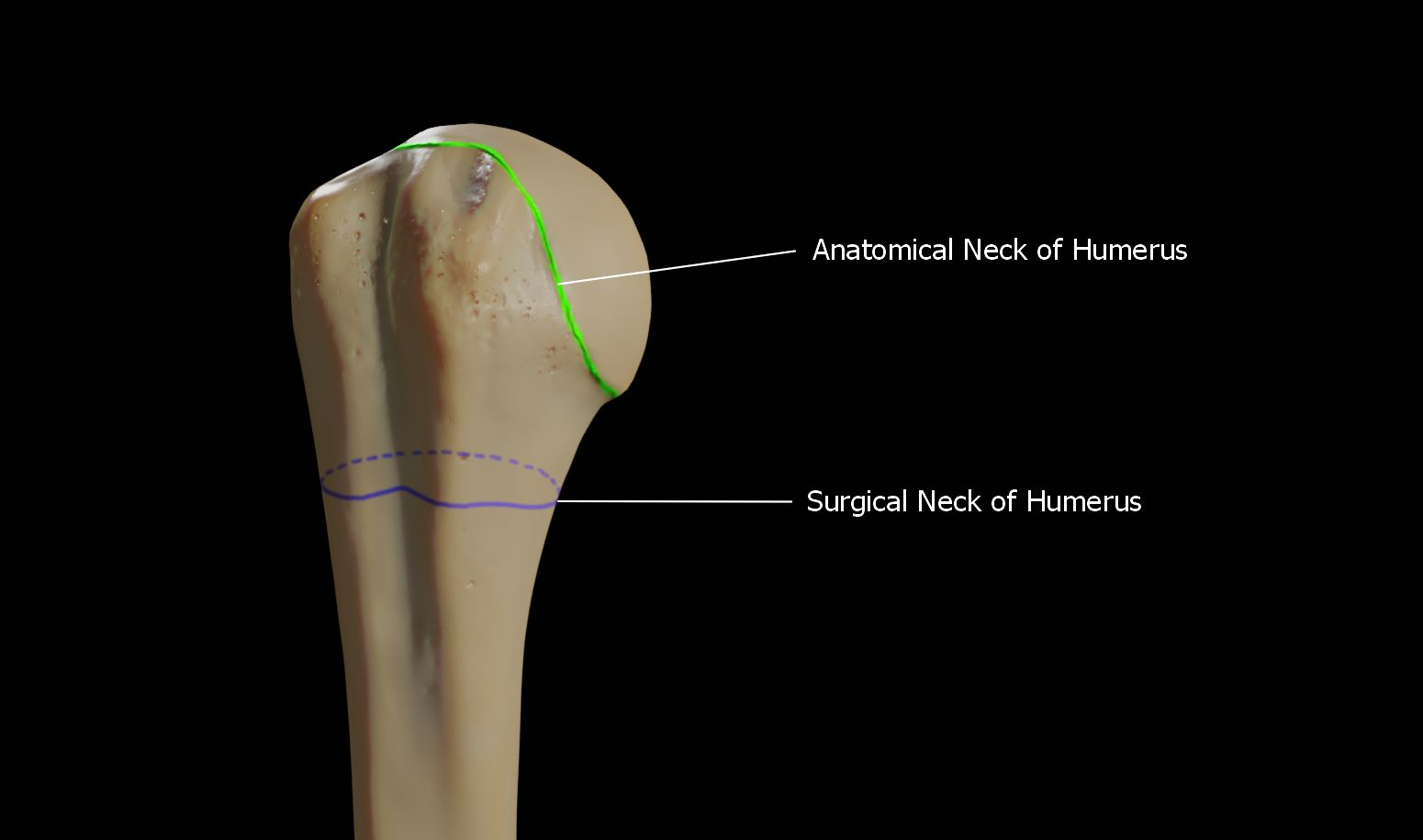
The difference between anatomical neck and surgical neck of the humerus
