= Erb =

Erb, ERB or ErB may refer to:

== People ==
- Edgar Rice Burroughs (1875–1950), American author
- Erb of Gwent (c. 524–c. 555), king of Gwent and Glywysing
- Elizabeth Rose Bloodflame, British VTuber

=== Surname ===
- Abraham Erb (1772–1830), American-born Canadian settler
- Albrecht Erb (1628–1714), Austrian clockmaker
- Charles F. Erb (1902–1952), American football player and coach
- Christopher Erb (born 1972), American marketer
- David Erb (1923–2019), retired jockey
- Dilman Kinsey Erb (1857–1936), Canadian politician
- Elke Erb (1938–2024), German author-poet, literary editor, and translator
- Jacob Walter Erb (1909–1990), Canadian politician
- James Erb (1926–2014), American composer
- Jeffrey D. Erb (born 1969), American filmmaker
- Joseph L. Erb (born 1974), Native American filmmaker
- Karl Erb (1877–1958), German singer
- Lester Erb (born 1969), American football coach
- Lillian Erb (1922–2008), American politician
- Mario Erb (born 1990), German footballer
- Summer Erb (born 1977), American basketball player
- Ute Erb (born 1940), German writer, poet, and translator
- Wilhelm Heinrich Erb (1840–1921), German neurologist

== Biology and health ==
- Erb's palsy, a paralysis of the arm due to nerve damage
- Erb's point (disambiguation), which can refer to:
  - The nerve point of neck
  - A point between the third and fourth rib, in front of the heart (see Surface anatomy#Surface anatomy of the thorax)
- Limb-girdle muscular dystrophy, also called Erb's muscular dystrophy, or simply Erb's
- Estrogen receptor beta (ERβ), one of two main types of estrogen receptors

== Technology ==
- Effective resolution bandwidth
- Equivalent rectangular bandwidth
- Erb, an implementation of eRuby

== Organizations ==
- Edgar Rice Burroughs, Inc., an American media company
- Educational Records Bureau, an American educational testing organization
- Eel River Brewing Company, an American brewery
- Engineers Registration Board, in Uganda
- Erb Institute, an institute at the University of Michigan
- Estonian Rescue Board, a government agency under the Ministry of the Interior of Estonia
- Ethical review board, or institutional review board, type of committee that applies research ethics
- European Radio for Belarus, an international radio station based in Warsaw

== Other uses ==
- Epic Rap Battles of History, a YouTube web series
- Extended-range bass, a special type of electric bass guitar
- Eyes-on-the-Road-Benefit, a purported advantages of using a heads-up-display
- 5621 Erb, a minor planet
- Einstein-Rosen bridge, other term for wormhole

== See also ==
- Herb (disambiguation)
