= Pectoral nerve =

Pectoral nerve may refer to:

- Lateral pectoral nerve
- Medial pectoral nerve
