= Anterior thoracic nerves =

Anterior thoracic nerves may refer to:

- Lateral pectoral nerve
- Medial pectoral nerve
