= Cervical spinal nerve 5 =

Spinal nerve of the cervical segment

Cervical spinal nerve
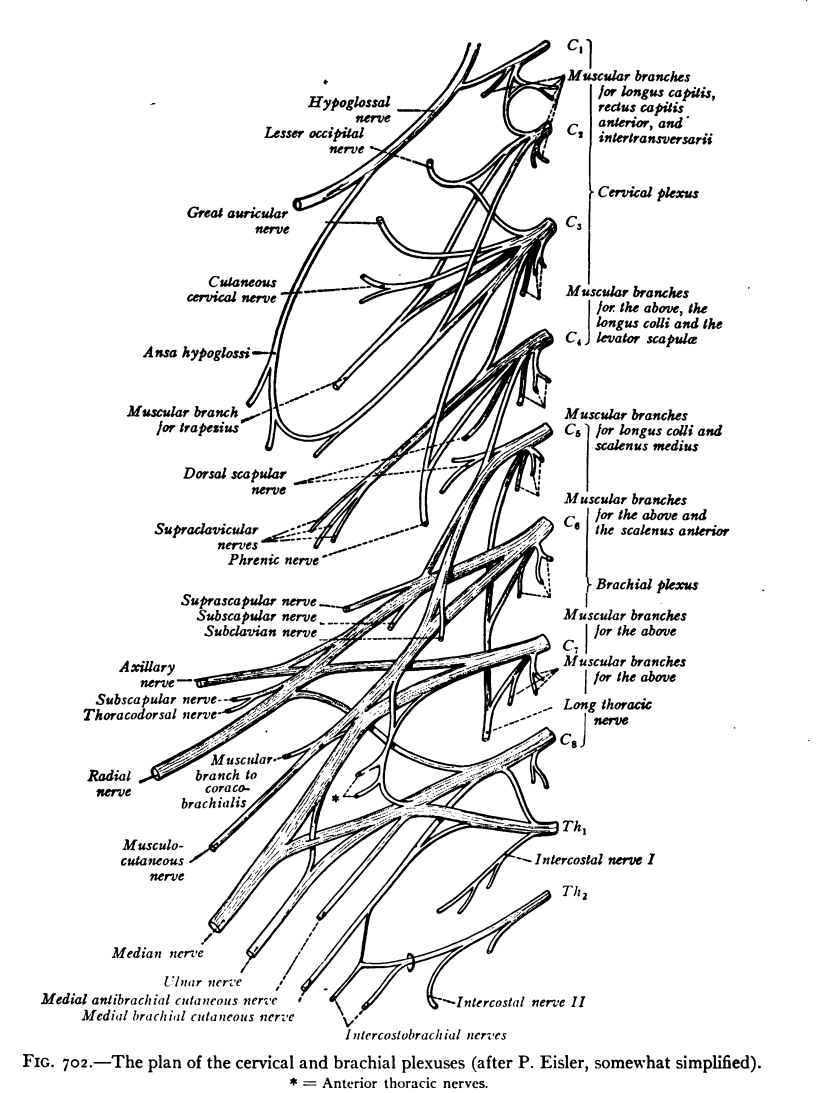
- The plan of the cervical and brachial plexuses.

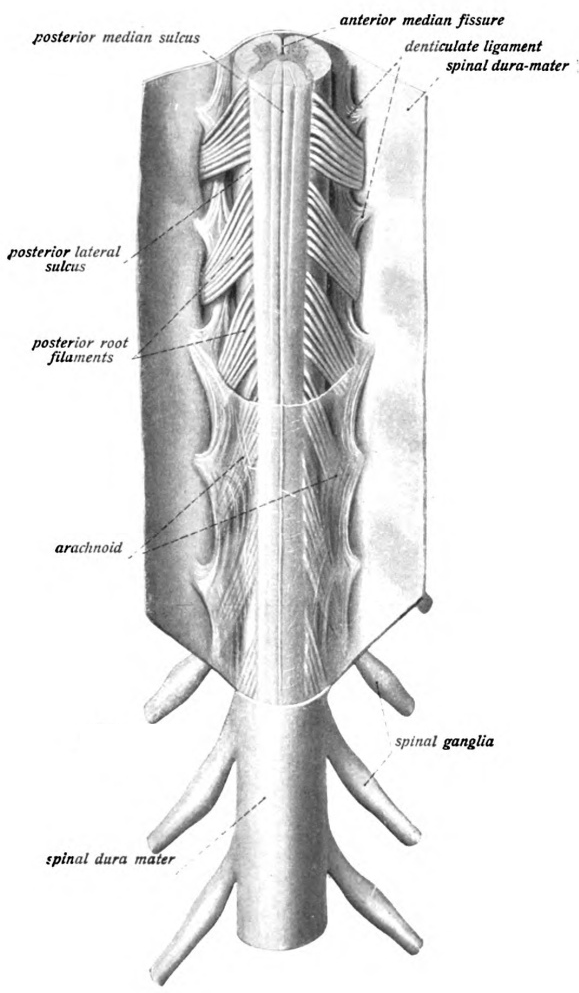
- The spinal cord with spinal nerves.

Details

Identifiers
- Latin: nervi spinalis
- FMA: 6446

The cervical spinal nerve 5 (C5) is a spinal nerve of the cervical segment.

It originates from the spinal column from above the cervical vertebra 5 (C5). It contributes to the phrenic nerve, long thoracic nerve, and dorsal scapular nerve before joining cervical spinal nerve 6 to form the upper trunk, a trunk of the brachial plexus, which then forms the lateral cord, and finally the musculocutaneous nerve.

== Additional images ==
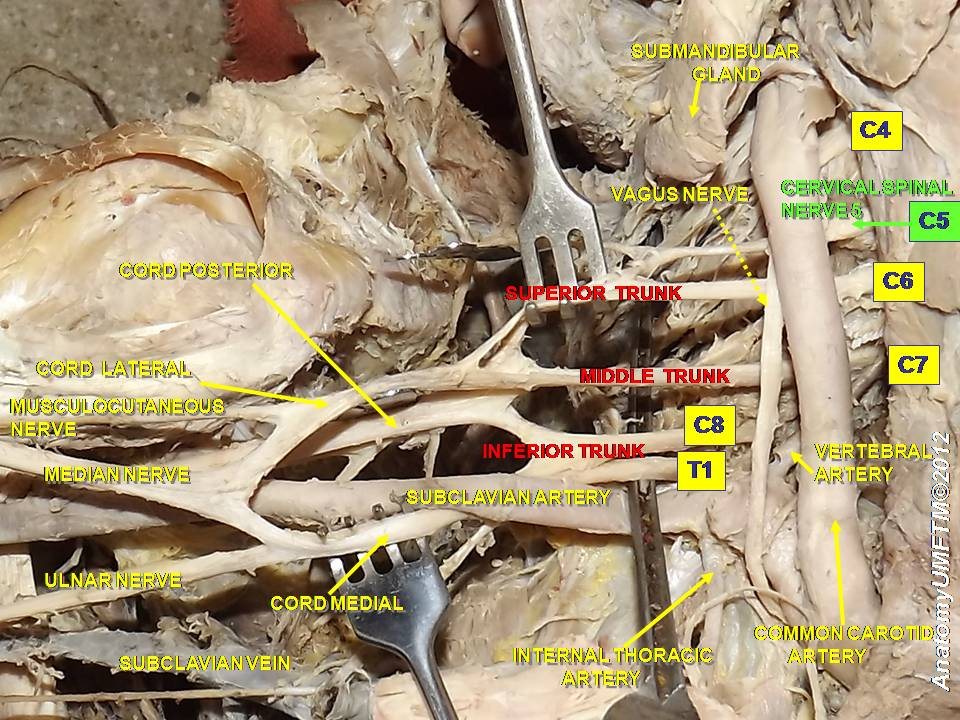
Cervical spinal nerve 5
