= Nerve point of neck =

Aspect of human anatomy

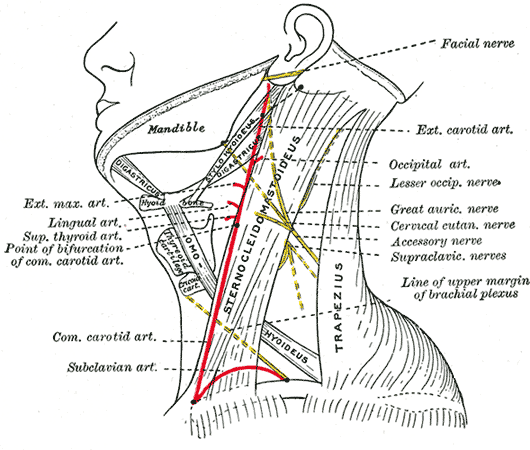
- Side of neck, showing chief surface markings.

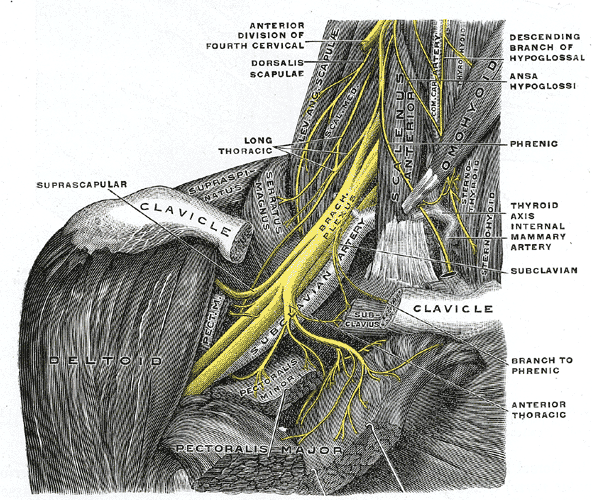
- The right brachial plexus with its short branches in anterior view.

Details

Identifiers
- Latin: punctum nervosum

The nerve point of the neck, also known as Erb's point, is a site at the upper trunk of the brachial plexus located 2–3 cm above the clavicle. It is named for Wilhelm Heinrich Erb. Taken together, there are six types of nerves that meet at this point.

"Erb's point" is also a term used in head and neck surgery to describe the point on the posterior border of the sternocleidomastoid muscle, approximately 2-3 cm above the clavicle, overlying the transverse process of the sixth cervical vertebra, where the four superficial branches of the cervical plexus—the greater auricular, lesser occipital, transverse cervical, and supraclavicular nerves—emerge from behind the muscle. This point is located approximately at the junction of the upper and middle thirds of this muscle. From here, the accessory nerve courses through the posterior triangle of the neck to enter the anterior border of the trapezius muscle at a point located approximately at the junction of the middle and lower thirds of the anterior border of this muscle. The spinal accessory nerve can often be found 1 cm above Erb's point.

== Structure ==
=== Convergence of nerves ===
Erb's point is formed by the union of the C5 and C6 nerve roots, which later converge. At the nerve trunk, branches of suprascapular nerves and the nerve to the subclavius also merge. The merged nerve divides into the anterior and posterior division of C5 and C6.

== Clinical significance ==
Injury to Erb's point is commonly sustained at birth or from a fall onto the shoulder. The nerve roots normally involved are C5 and partly C6. Symptoms include paralysis of the biceps, brachialis, and coracobrachialis (through the musculocutaneous nerve); the brachioradialis (through the radial nerve); and the deltoid (through the axillary nerve). The effect is called "Erb's palsy". Typically, an affected person's arm hangs at the side with the hand rotated medially, like a porter waiting for a tip; hence the colloquial name "porter's tip hand".
