= Coracobrachialis muscle =

Muscle of the upper arm

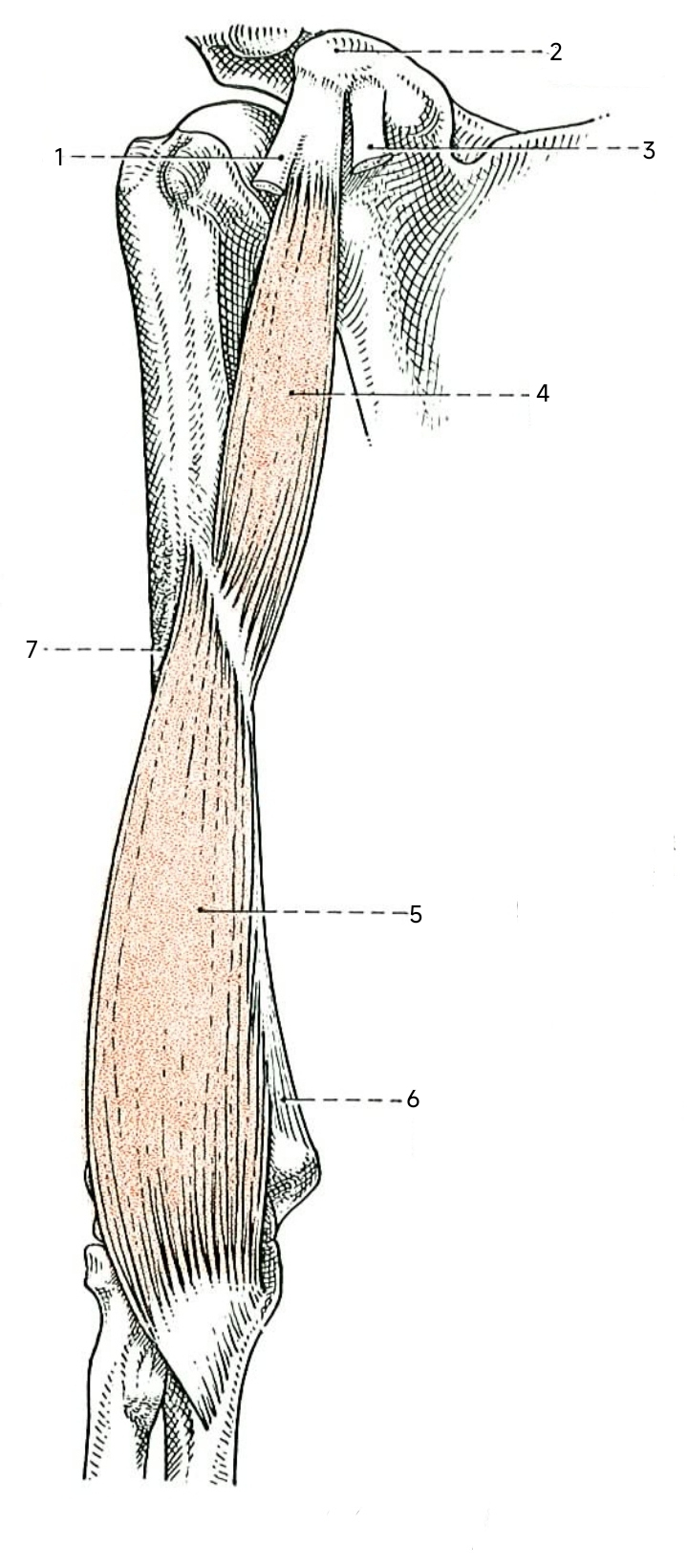
- Muscles coracobrachialis and brachialis. Right upper limb. Anterior view. 1, Short head of biceps — 2, Coracoid process — 3, Pectoralis minor — 4, Coracobrachialis — 5, Brachialis —6, Medial intermuscular septum — 7, Deltoid impression of the humerus. (After Charpy.)

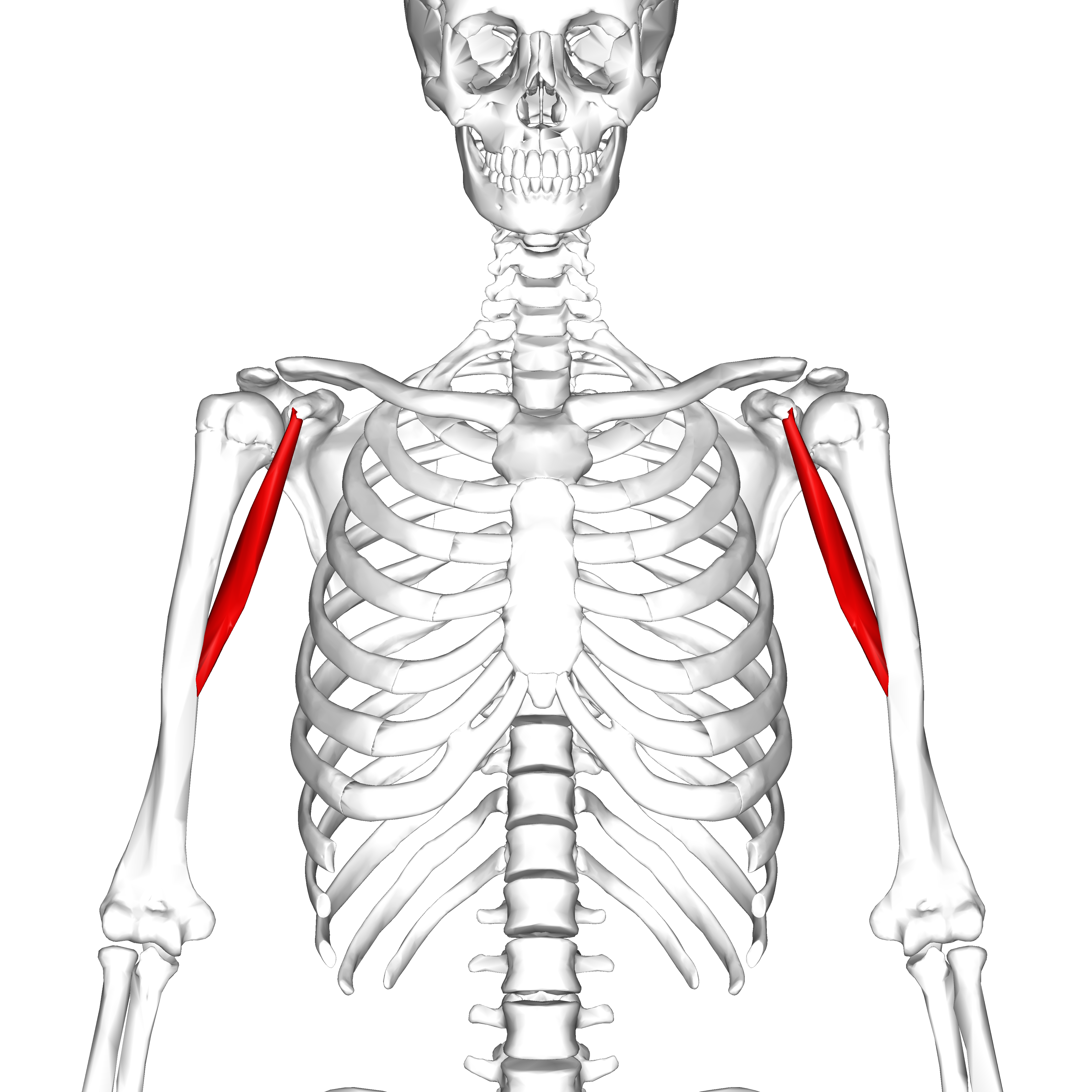
- Position of coracobrachialis muscle (shown in red)

Details
- Origin: Coracoid process of scapula
- Insertion: Anteromedial surface of humerus distal to crest of lesser tubercle
- Artery: Brachial artery
- Nerve: Musculocutaneous nerve (C5, C6, and C7)
- Actions: Adducts humerus, flexes the arm at glenohumeral joint

Identifiers
- Latin: musculus coracobrachialis
- TA98: A04.6.02.017
- TA2: 2468
- FMA: 37664

The coracobrachialis muscle is a muscle in the upper medial part of the arm. It is located within the anterior compartment of the arm. It originates from the coracoid process of the scapula; it inserts onto the middle of the medial aspect of the body of the humerus. It is innervated by the musculocutaneous nerve. It acts to adduct and flex the arm.

== Structure ==
=== Origin ===
Coracobrachialis muscle arises from the (deep surface of the) apex of the coracoid process of the scapula (a common origin with the short head of the biceps brachii). It additionally also arises from the proximal portion of tendon of origin of the biceps brachii muscle.

=== Insertion ===
It is inserted (by means of a flat tendon) into an impression at the middle of the medial border of the body of the humerus (shaft of the humerus) between the attachments of the medial head of the triceps brachii and the brachialis.

=== Innervation ===
Coracobrachialis muscle is perforated by and innervated by the musculocutaneous nerve, which arises from the anterior division of the upper trunk (C5, C6) and middle trunk (C7) of the brachial plexus.

=== Variation ===
The coracobrachialis muscle has been classified into distinct superficial and deep layers. In 16% of individuals the muscle is fully divided into these layers, in 8% of individuals there is incomplete separation, and in the 76% there is no discernible separation of the layers.

== Function ==
The coracobrachialis is functionally insignificant. It is a weak flexor and adductor of the arm at the glenohumeral joint (shoulder joint).

It additionally also resists deviation of the arm from the frontal plane during abduction.

== Clinical significance ==
The overuse of the coracobrachialis can lead to stiffening of the muscle. Common causes of injury include chest workouts or activities that require one to press the arm very tight towards the body, e.g. work on the rings in gymnastics.

Symptoms of overuse or injury are pain in the arm and shoulder, radiating down to the back of the hand. In more severe cases, the musculocutaneous nerve can get trapped, causing disturbances in sensation to the skin on the radial part of the forearm and weakened flexion of the elbow, as the nerve also supplies the biceps brachii and brachialis muscles.

Rupture of the coracobrachialis muscle is extremely rare. Very few case reports exist in the literature, and it is reported to be caused by direct trauma to the contracted muscle. Avulsion of the muscle's origin from the coracoid as a result of indirect forces is even more unusual.

== Additional images ==
Position of coracobrachialis muscle (shown in red). Animation.

Close up. Seen from below. Ribs are not shown.

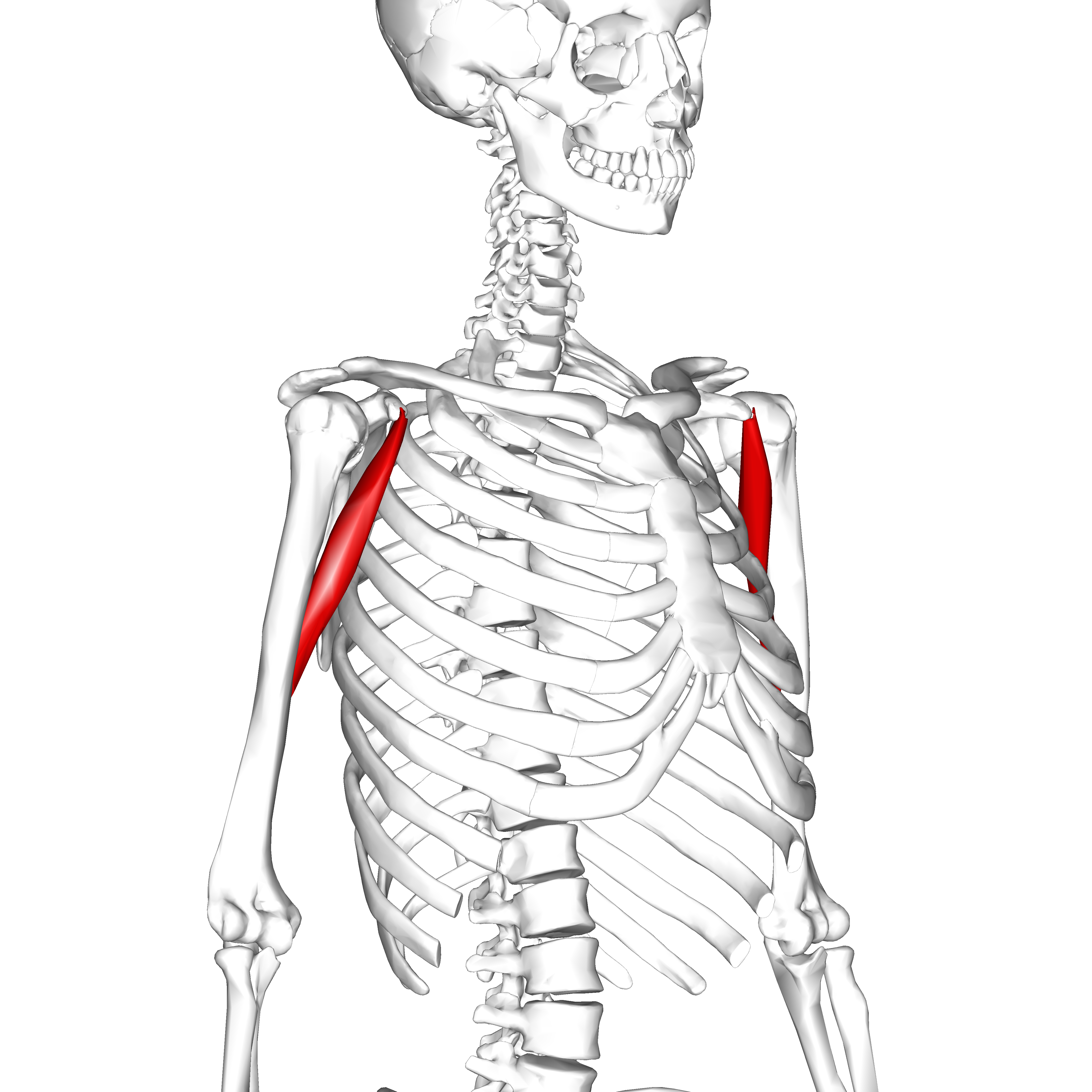
Still image. Lateral view.

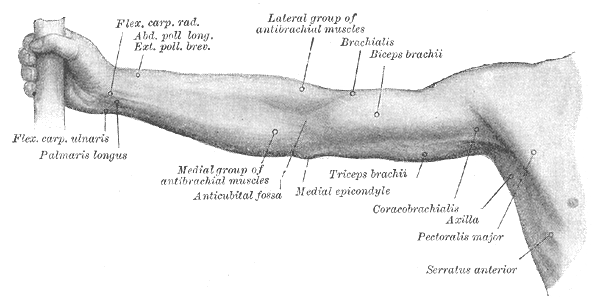
Front of right upper extremity. (Coracobrachialis labeled at right, fourth from the bottom.)

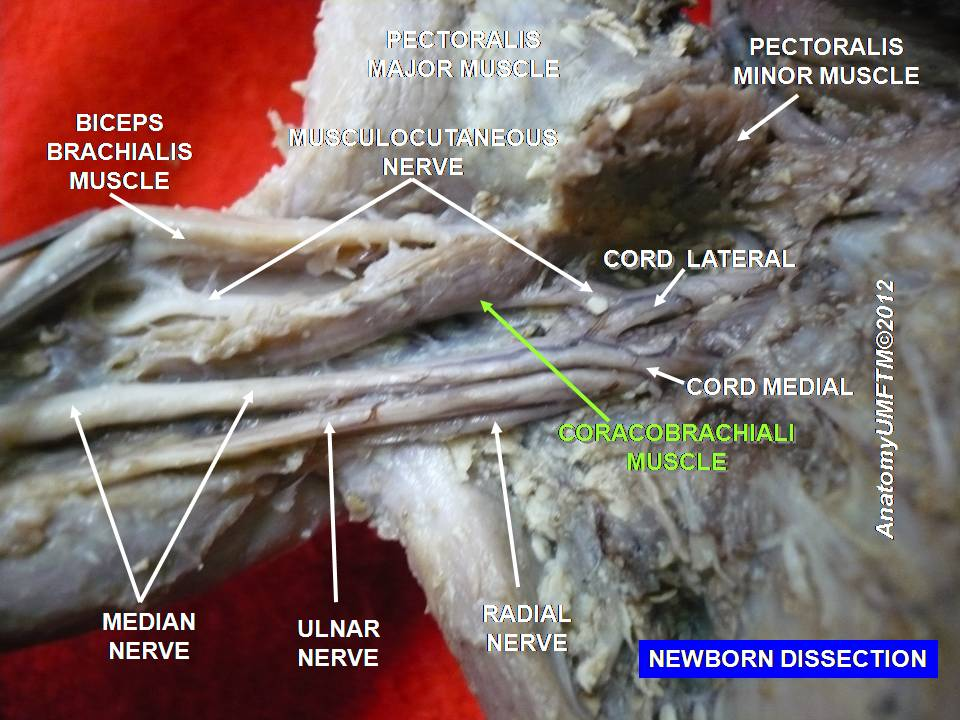
Coracobrachialis muscle (shown in green text)

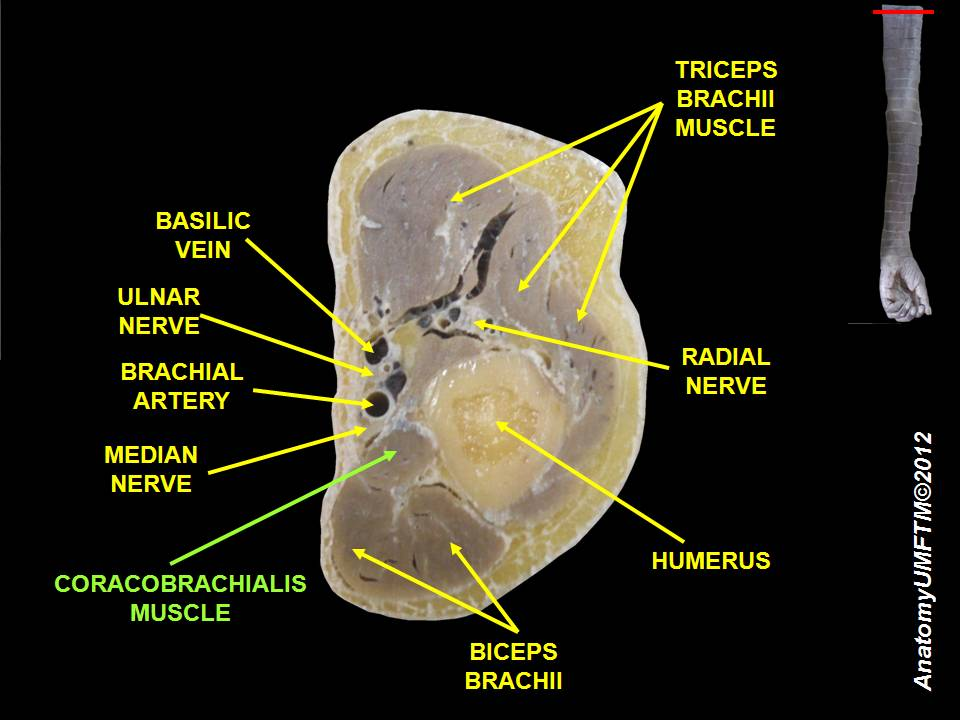
Coracobrachialis muscle (shown in green text). Horizontal section of arm.

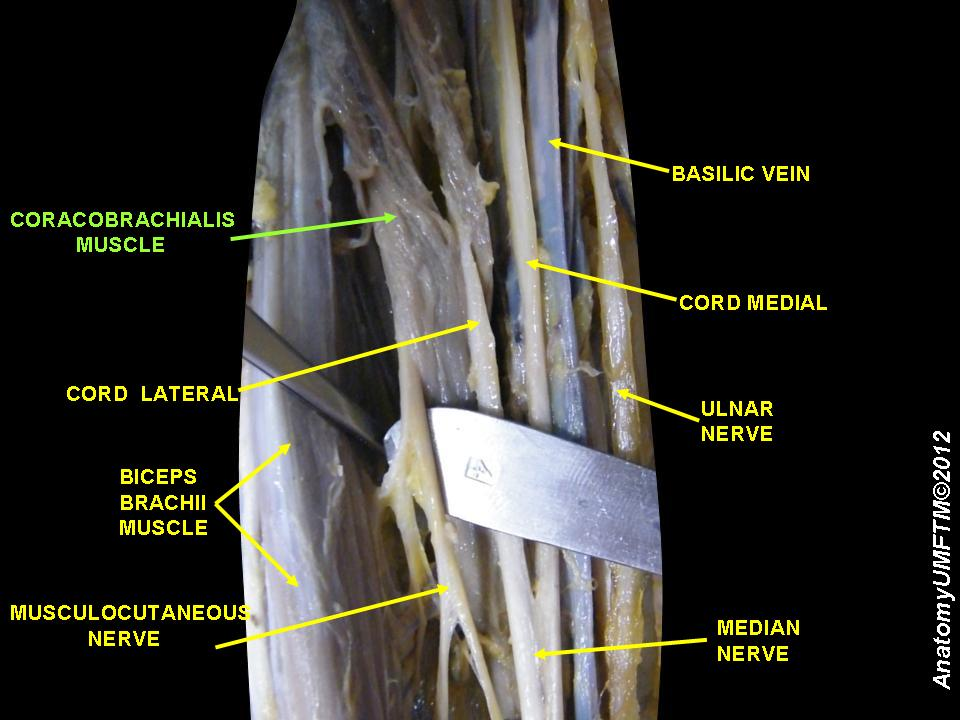
Coracobrachialis muscle (shown in green text)

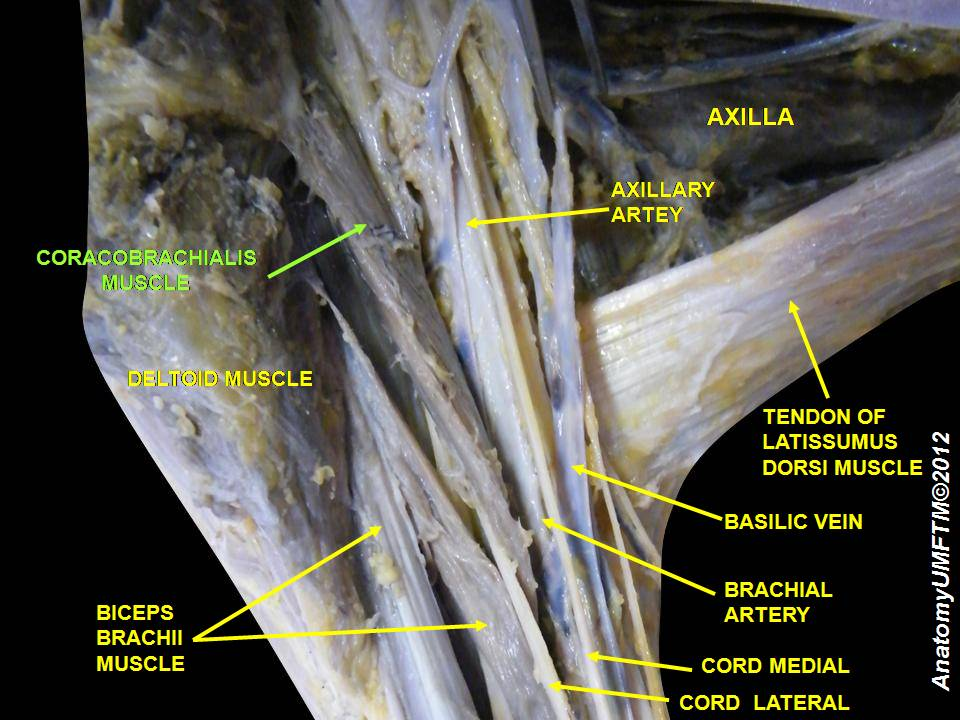
Coracobrachialis muscle (shown in green text)

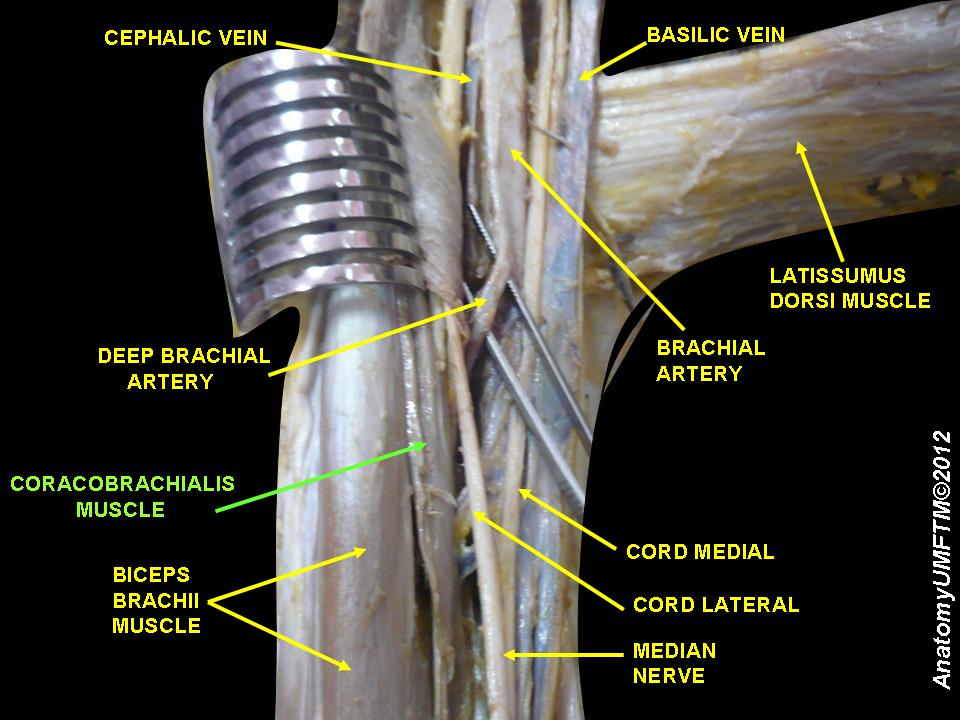
Coracobrachialis muscle (shown in green text)
