= Erb's point =

Erb's point can refer to:

- Erb's point (neurology)
- Erb's point (cardiology)
