= Wilhelm Heinrich Erb =

German neurologist (1840–1921)

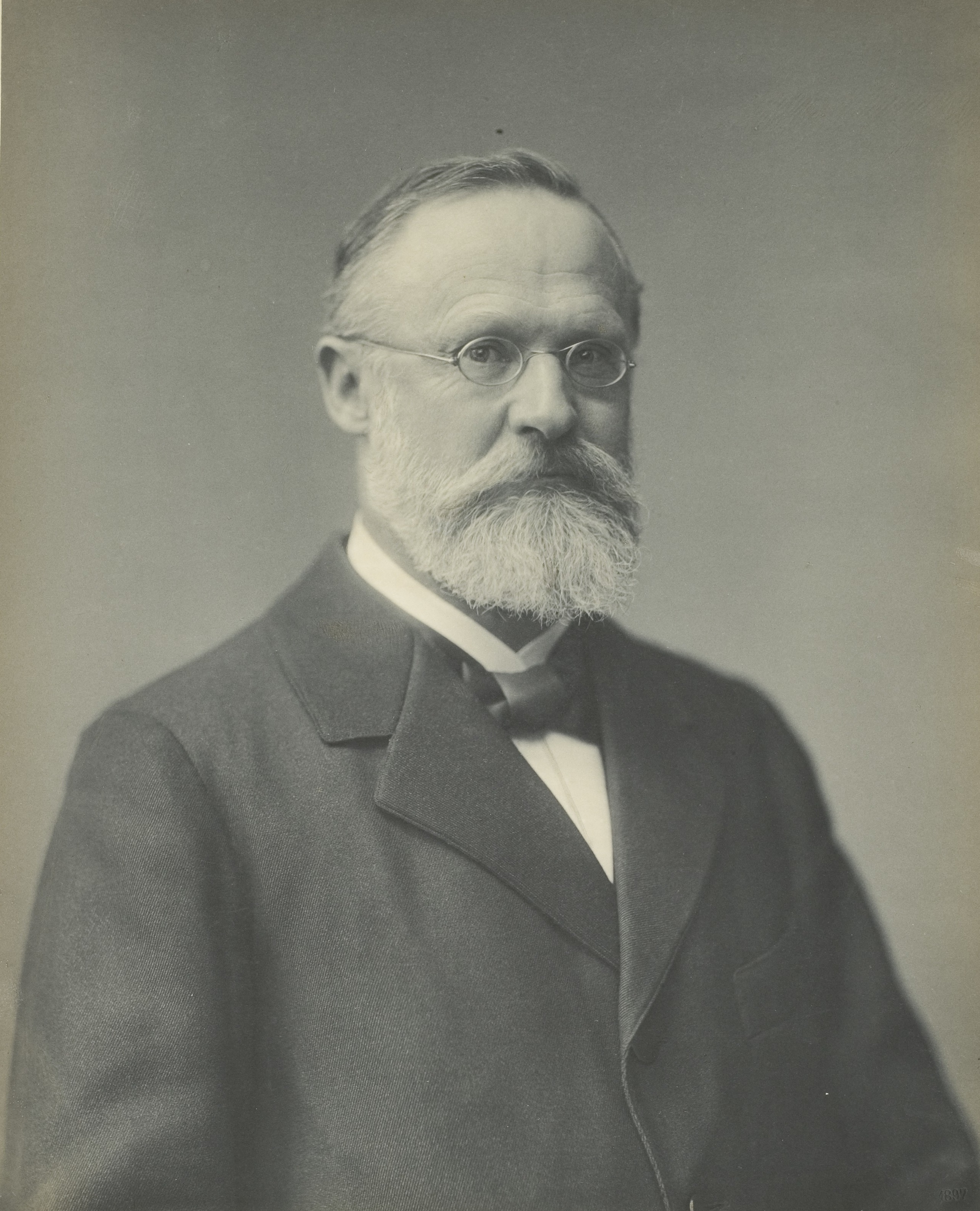
- Born: 30 November 1840; Winnweiler, Palatinate, Kingdom of Bavaria
- Died: 29 October 1921 (aged 80); Heidelberg, Republic of Baden, Weimar Republic
- Education: Heidelberg University; University of Erlangen; Ludwig-Maximilians-Universität München
- Scientific career
- Fields: Pathology; Neurology
- Workplaces: Heidelberg University; Leipzig University

Wilhelm Heinrich Erb (30 November 1840 – 29 October 1921) was a German neurologist. He was born in Winnweiler, and died in Heidelberg.

== Academic career ==
In 1864, Erb received his medical degree at Heidelberg University, where for several years he served as an assistant to pathologist Nikolaus Friedreich (1825–1882). As a young man, he also worked for a period of time under Ludwig von Buhl (1816–1880) at the Ludwig-Maximilians-Universität München. In 1880, Erb attained the chair of special pathology at Leipzig University, where he was also appointed head of its policlinic. In 1883, he succeeded Friedreich at Heidelberg University, where he worked until his retirement in 1907. Psychiatrist Emil Kraepelin (1856–1926) and neurologists Ernst Julius Remak (1849–1911), Max Nonne (1861–1959) and Paul Julius Möbius (1853–1907) were among his better known students and assistants.

Up until his death in 1921, he served as honorary president of the Gesellschaft Deutscher Nervenärzte (Society of German Neurologists).

== Neurological research ==
Erb began his medical career in the fields of toxicology and histology, but later his interest switched to neurology, of which he became one of the 19th century's leading neurologists. He extensively used electrodiagnostic testing and demonstrated heightened motor nerve sensitivity in tetanus. In 1875, he described the classic knee-jerk reflex which was also independently noted at the same time by Karl Friedrich Otto Westphal. He is also credited with popularizing the reflex hammer for use in neurological examinations.

He made early observations associated with syphilis to tabes dorsalis (nerve fiber and nerve cell degeneration). In his research of tabes dorsalis, he tried to find the link between this condition and syphilis. He also made contributions in his research of poliomyelitis, claudication intermittens, and progressive muscular atrophy. In 1878, he described myasthenia gravis, a condition sometimes referred to as the "Erb-Goldflam disease" (named along with neurologist Samuel Goldflam). Myasthenia gravis is a neuromuscular disorder that leads to fatigue and muscle weakness.

He was the author of over 250 medical works, including Handbuch der Elektrotherapie (a textbook on electrotherapy), and an important study on spinal paralysis. In 1891, he contributed to the foundation of the journal, Deutsche Zeitschrift für Nervenheilkunde – in its first volume, he published a survey on muscular dystrophies.

== Associated eponyms ==
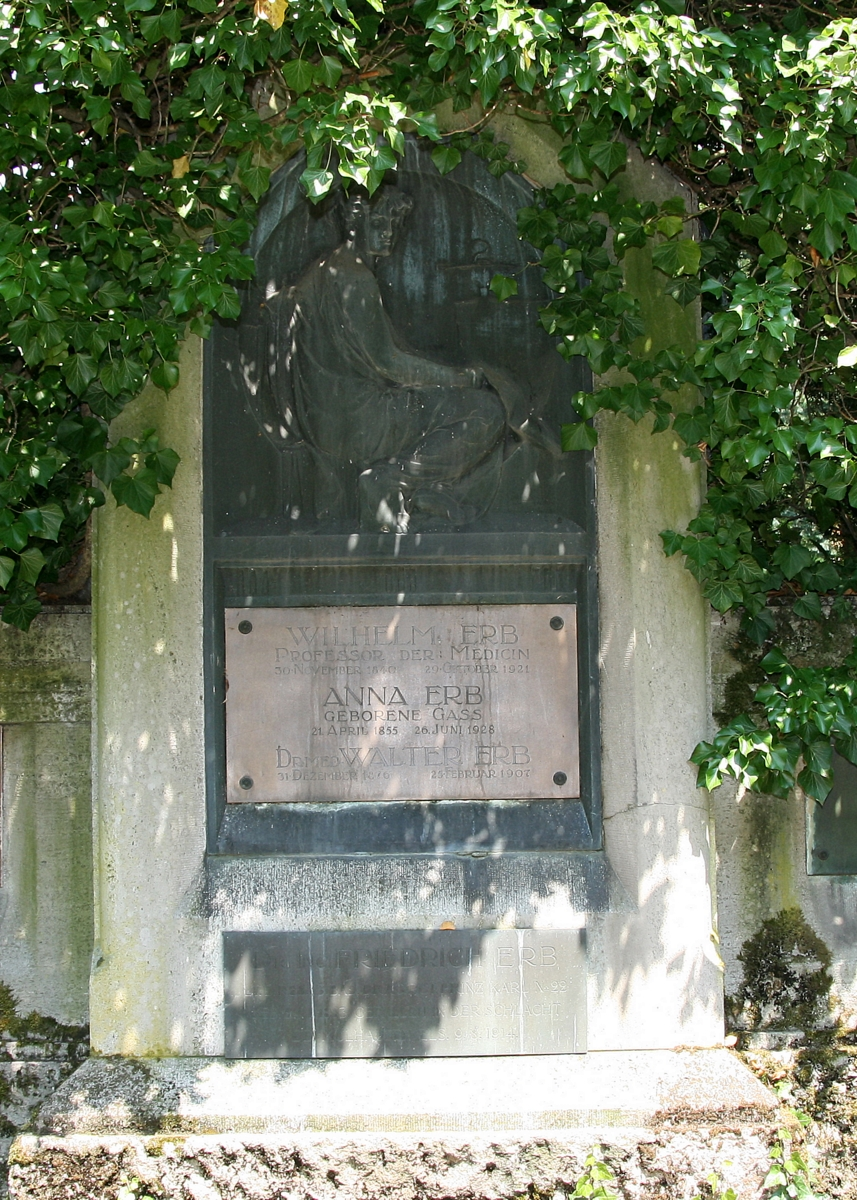
Erb's grave in Heidelberg

- Erb's palsy, also known as Erb-Duchenne palsy (named with French neurologist Guillaume Duchenne de Boulogne) or brachial plexus palsy: a muscular paralysis during childbirth.
- Erb-Charcot paralysis: a rare form of spinal syphilis; named with French neurologist Jean-Martin Charcot.
- Erb's point: an anatomical location 2–3 cm above the clavicle. Electrical stimulation over this region causes contraction of various arm muscles.
- Erb-Westphal symptom: a reflex anomaly seen in tabes dorsalis, named with German neurologist Karl Friedrich Otto Westphal.
- Erb's spot: an auscultatory spot in cardiology, located in the third intercostal space, three centimeters to the left, which allows an evaluation of most heart sounds and murmurs.

== Selected publications ==
- Zur Pathologie and pathologische Anatomie peripherischer Paralysen, (Pathology and pathological anatomy of peripheral paralysis), 1867/1868.
- Handbuch der Krankheiten der peripheren cerebrospinalen Nerven (Textbook involving disorders of the peripheral cerebro-spinal nerves), 1874.
- Über eimen wenig bekannten spinalen Symptomenkomplex. Berliner klinische Wochenschrift, 1875, 12: 357–359. (Erb-Charcot disease – spastic spinal paralysis).
- Handbuch der Krankheiten des Nervensystems. (Textbook on disorders of the nervous system) two volumes. Leipzig, F. C. W. Vogel, 1876–1878.
- Ueber die spastische Spinalparalyse (Tabes dorsal spasmodique, Charcot); (On spastic spinal paralysis), 1877.
- Handbuch der Elektrotherapie, (Textbook of electrotherapy), 1882.
