= Erb's palsy =

Paralysis of the arm usually caused during birth

- Other names: Erb–Duchenne palsy
- Brachial plexus. Erb's palsy primarily affects C5 and C6.
- Specialty: Pediatrics, neurology
- Treatment: Nerve transfers, subscapularis releases and latissimus dorsi tendon transfers

Erb's palsy is a paralysis of the arm caused by injury to the upper group of the arm's main nerves, specifically the severing of the upper trunk C5–C6 nerves. These form part of the brachial plexus, comprising the ventral rami of spinal nerves C5–C8 and thoracic nerve T1. These injuries arise most commonly, but not exclusively, from shoulder dystocia during a difficult birth. Depending on the nature of the damage, the paralysis can either resolve on its own over a period of months, necessitate rehabilitative therapy, or require surgery.

== Presentation ==
The paralysis can be partial or complete; the damage to each nerve can range from bruising to tearing. The most commonly involved root is C5 (aka Erb's point: the union of C5 & C6 roots) as this is mechanically the furthest point from the force of traction, therefore, the first/most affected. Erb–Duchenne palsy presents as a lower motor neuron syndrome associated with sensibility disturbance and vegetative phenomena.

The most commonly involved nerves are the suprascapular nerve, musculocutaneous nerve, and the axillary nerve.

The signs of Erb's palsy include loss of sensation in the arm and paralysis and atrophy of the deltoid, biceps, and brachialis muscles. "The position of the limb, under such conditions, is characteristic: the arm hangs by the side and is rotated medially; the forearm is extended and pronated. The arm cannot be raised from the side; all power of flexion of the elbow is lost, as is also supination of the forearm". The resulting biceps damage is the main cause of this classic physical position commonly called "waiter's tip".

If the injury occurs at age early enough to affect development (e.g. as a neonate or infant), it often leaves the patient with stunted growth in the affected arm with everything from the shoulder through to the fingertips smaller than the unaffected arm. This also leaves the patient with impaired muscular, nervous and circulatory development. The lack of muscular development leads to the arm being much weaker than the unaffected one, and less articulate, with many patients unable to lift the arm above shoulder height unaided, as well as leaving many with an elbow contracture.

The lack of development to the circulatory system can leave the arm with almost no ability to regulate its temperature, which often proves problematic during winter months when it would need to be closely monitored to ensure that the temperature of the arm was not dropping too far below that of the rest of the body. However the damage to the circulatory system also leaves the arm with another problem. It reduces the healing ability of the skin, so that skin damage takes far longer than usual to heal, and infections in the arm can be quite common if cuts are not sterilized as soon as possible.

The neurological damage is often the most problematic aspect of Erb's palsy, but it is also the most varying. There have been cases of patients who have lost complete sensory perception within the arm after procedures whereas they had full sensory perception before. The most common area for a loss of sensory perception (except where the arm faces a total loss) is between the shoulder and the elbow, since the nerves which provide information from that area to the brain are also those first damaged in the initial causative trauma.

== Cause ==
The most common cause of Erb's palsy is dystocia, an abnormal or difficult childbirth or labor. For example, it can occur if the infant's head and neck are pulled toward the side at the same time as the shoulders pass through the birth canal. The condition can also be caused by excessive pulling on the shoulders during a cephalic presentation (head first delivery), or by pressure on the raised arms during a breech (feet first) delivery. Erb's palsy can also affect neonates affected by a clavicle fracture unrelated to dystocia.

A similar injury may be observed at any age following trauma to the head and shoulder, which cause the nerves of the plexus to violently stretch, with the upper trunk of the plexus sustaining the greatest injury. Injury may also occur as the result of direct violence, including gunshot wounds and traction on the arm, or attempting to diminish shoulder joint dislocation. The level of damage to the constituent nerves is related to the amount of paralysis.

== Diagnosis ==
The appearance of the affected arm (or arms) depends on the individual case. In some cases the arm may lack the ability to straighten or rotate but otherwise function normally giving the overall appearance of the arm to be stiff and crooked. Whereas in other circumstances the arm has little to no control and has a "loose" appearance. Treatment such as physiotherapy, massage and electrical stimulation can help to prevent this early on (or throughout) the patient's life by strengthening the arm.

In some cases, individuals may experience significant discomfort. For instance, they might suffer from severe cramping pain that persists for a while and is especially intense after sleeping, radiating from the shoulder down to the wrist. While not everyone with Erb's palsy experiences pain, it can be extremely distressing for those who do, sometimes leading to physical sickness or fainting. This severe nerve pain is most common during the final stages of growth and generally subsides over time. Other types of pain that people with Erb's palsy might experience include muscle strain, stiffness, circulatory issues, and cramping. Different factors are dependent on the severity of the condition and can vary, so whilst some patient experience a lot of pain, some patients may experience no pain at all and for their affected arm to simply be visually crooked.

Discomfort with the shoulder blade is also extremely common in Erb's palsy as the shoulder is often at risk of dislocation. This can result, again, in sickness or lack of sleep.

== Treatment ==
Some babies recover on their own; however, some may require specialist intervention.

Neonatal/pediatric neurosurgery is often required for avulsion fracture repair. Lesions may heal over time and function return. Physiotherapeutic care is often required to regain muscle usage. Although range of motion is recovered in many children under one year in age, individuals who have not yet healed after this point will rarely gain full function in their arm and may develop arthritis.

The three most common treatments for Erb's palsy are nerve transfers (usually from the opposite arm or limb), subscapularis releases and latissimus dorsi tendon transfers.

Nerve transfers are usually performed on babies under the age of 9 months since the fast development of younger babies increases the effectiveness of the procedure. They are not usually carried out on patients older than this because when the procedure is done on older infants, more harm than good is done, and it can result in nerve damage in the area from which the nerves were taken. Scarring can vary from faint scars along the lines of the neck to full "T" shapes across the whole shoulder depending on the training of the surgeon and the nature of the transplant.

Subscapularis releases, however, are not time limited. Since it is merely cutting a "Z" shape into the subscapularis muscle to provide stretch within the arm, it can be carried out at almost any age and can be carried out repeatedly on the same arm; however, this will compromise the integrity of the muscle.

Latissimus dorsi tendon transfers involve cutting the latissimus dorsi in half horizontally in order to pull part of the muscle around and attach it to the outside of the biceps. This procedure provides external rotation with varying degrees of success. A side effect may be increased sensitivity of the part of the biceps where the muscle will now lie, since the latissimus dorsi has roughly twice the number of nerve endings per square inch of other muscles.

== History ==
The renowned British obstetrician William Smellie is credited with the first medical description of an obstetric brachial plexus palsy. In his 1768 treatise on midwifery, he reported a case of transient bilateral arm paralysis in a newborn after difficult labour.

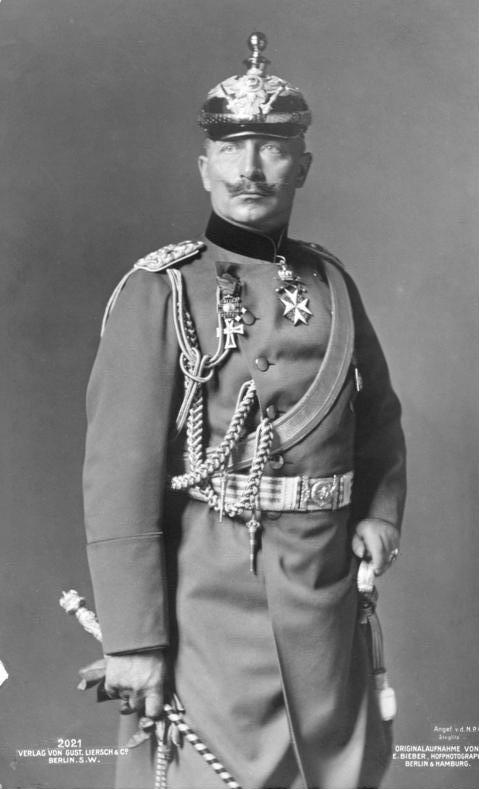
Kaiser Wilhelm II was affected by Erb's palsy in his left arm.

In 1861, Guillaume Benjamin Amand Duchenne coined the term "obstetric palsy of the brachial plexus" after analyzing four infants with paralysis of identical muscles in the arm and shoulder, after publishing his initial findings in 1855. In 1874, Wilhelm Heinrich Erb concluded in his thesis on adult brachial plexus injuries that associated palsies of the deltoid, biceps and subscapularis are derived from a radicular lesion at the level of C5 and C6 rather than isolated peripheral nerve lesions.

== Notable people ==
Notable individuals with Erb's palsy include Emperor Wilhelm II of Germany, King of Prussia, the Palestinian psychiatrist Samah Jabr, and the Canadian journalist Barbara Frum. Martin Sheen was injured during birth and developed the condition in his left arm. Brittni Mason, a gold-medalist American Paralympian, was born with Erb's palsy in her left arm.

Military brace has also caused Erb's palsy in military school cadets.

== See also ==
- Klumpke paralysis
