= Subclavian =

In general, Subclavian means beneath the clavicle, and it may refer to:

- Subclavian vein
- Subclavian artery
- Subclavian nerve (part of the Brachial plexus)
