= Upper trunk =

Part of the human anatomy

Details
- From: Ventral rami of C5 and C6
- To: Anterior division of upper trunk, posterior division of upper trunk, subclavian nerve, suprascapular nerve

Identifiers
- Latin: truncus superior plexus brachialis
- TA98: A14.2.03.004
- TA2: 6398
- FMA: 65216

The upper (superior) trunk is a part of the human nervous system, specifically the brachial plexus. It is formed by joining of the ventral rami of the fifth (C5) and sixth (C6) cervical nerves. The upper trunk divides into an anterior and posterior division.

The branches of the upper trunk from proximal to distal are:

- subclavian nerve (C5-C6)
- suprascapular nerve (C5-C6)
- anterior division of upper trunk (C5-C6, forms part of lateral cord)
- posterior division of upper trunk (C5-C6, forms part of posterior cord)

The axillary, radial, musculocutaneous and median nerves all contain axons derived from the upper trunk.

== Additional images ==
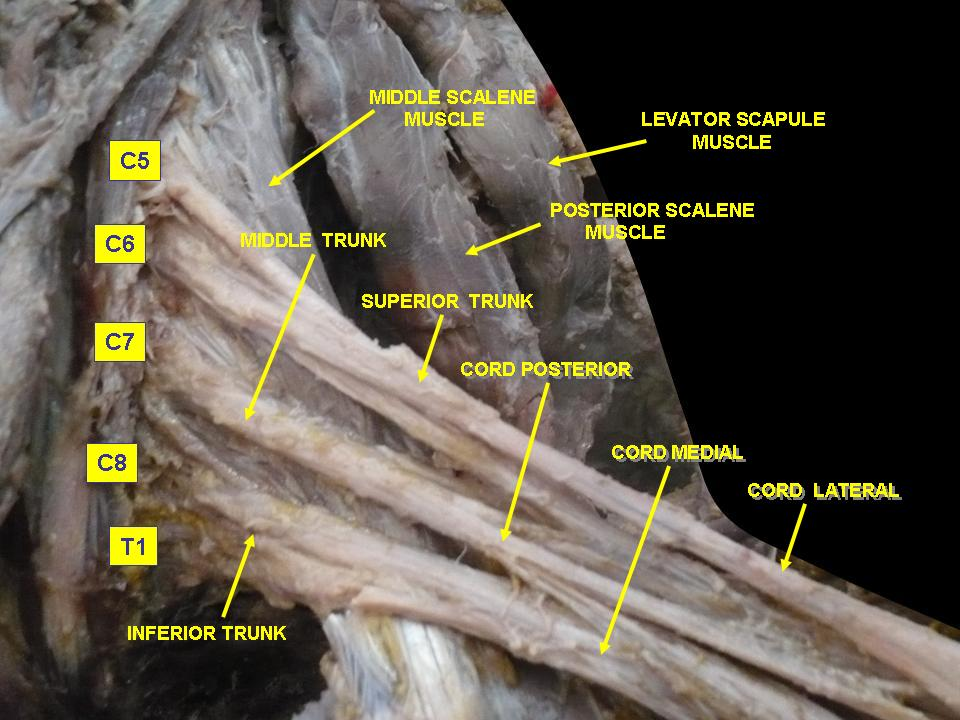
Brachial plexus. Deep dissection.

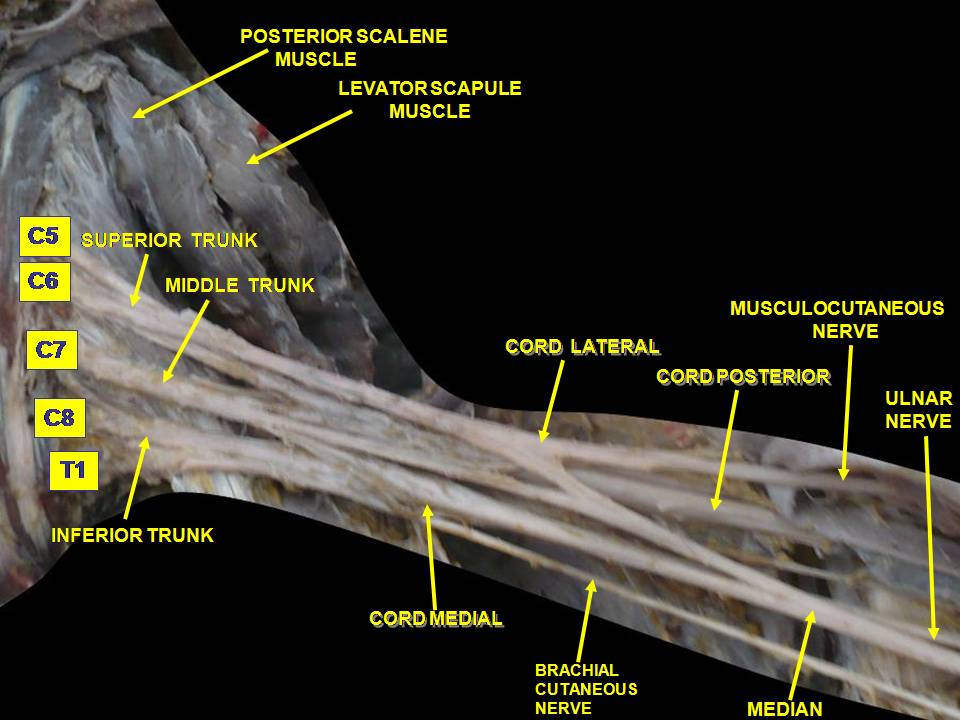
Brachial plexus. Deep dissection. Anterolateral view
