= Subclavian nerve =

Small branch of the brachial plexus

- Diagram of the right brachial plexus. Subclavian nerve labelled at top right.

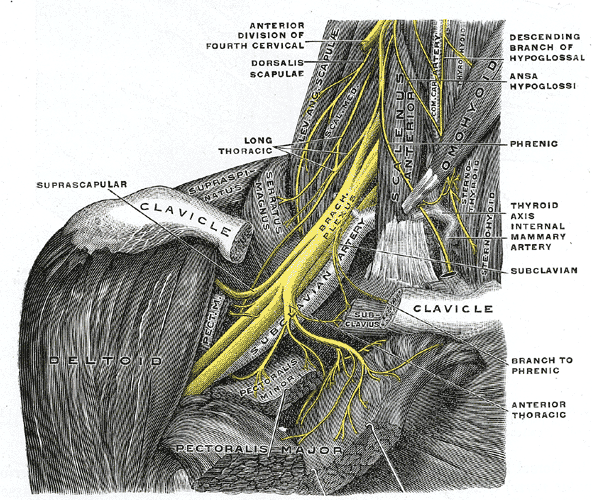
- The right brachial plexus with its short branches, viewed from in front. Subclavian nerve not visible.

Details
- From: Upper trunk (C5-C6) of brachial plexus
- To: Sometimes the accessory phrenic nerve
- Innervates: Subclavius muscle

Identifiers
- Latin: nervus subclavius
- TA98: A14.2.03.013
- TA2: 6412
- FMA: 65280

The subclavian nerve, also known as the nerve to the subclavius, is a small branch of the upper trunk of the brachial plexus. It contains axons from C5 and C6. It innervates the subclavius muscle.

== Anatomy ==
=== Origin ===
The subclavian nerve is a branch of the upper trunk of the brachial plexus. It contains axons derived from the ventral rami of the C5 and C6 cervical spinal nerves.

The origin is situated within the posterior triangle of the neck.

=== Course ===
Descending, it passes anterior to (the 3rd part of) the subclavian artery and vein.

=== Variation ===
==== Accessory phrenic nerve ====
The subclavian nerve may issue a branch called the accessory phrenic nerve which innervates the diaphragm. The accessory phrenic nerve may rather branch from the C4 or C6 segments or ansa cervicalis. This nerve usually joins with the phrenic nerve before innervating the diaphragm, ventral to the subclavian vein.

== Function ==
The subclavian nerve innervates the subclavius muscle.

== Additional images ==
Diagram of the brachial plexus. The subclavian nerve can be seen branching from where C5 and C6 join to form the upper trunk. (Label at top right).

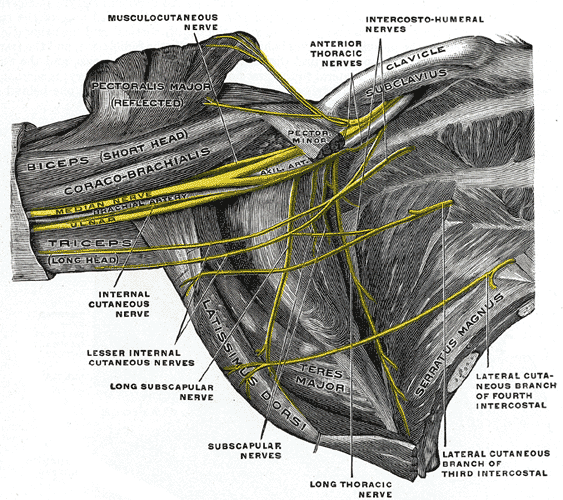
The right brachial plexus. The subclavian nerve is not visible, but the muscle it innervates called the subclavius can be seen underneath the clavicle.
