= Antecubital =

Antecubital refers to something that is positioned anteriorly to the elbow (Latin cubitus), such as:

- Antecubital fossa
- Antecubital vein
