= Albrecht Erb =

Austrian clockmaker

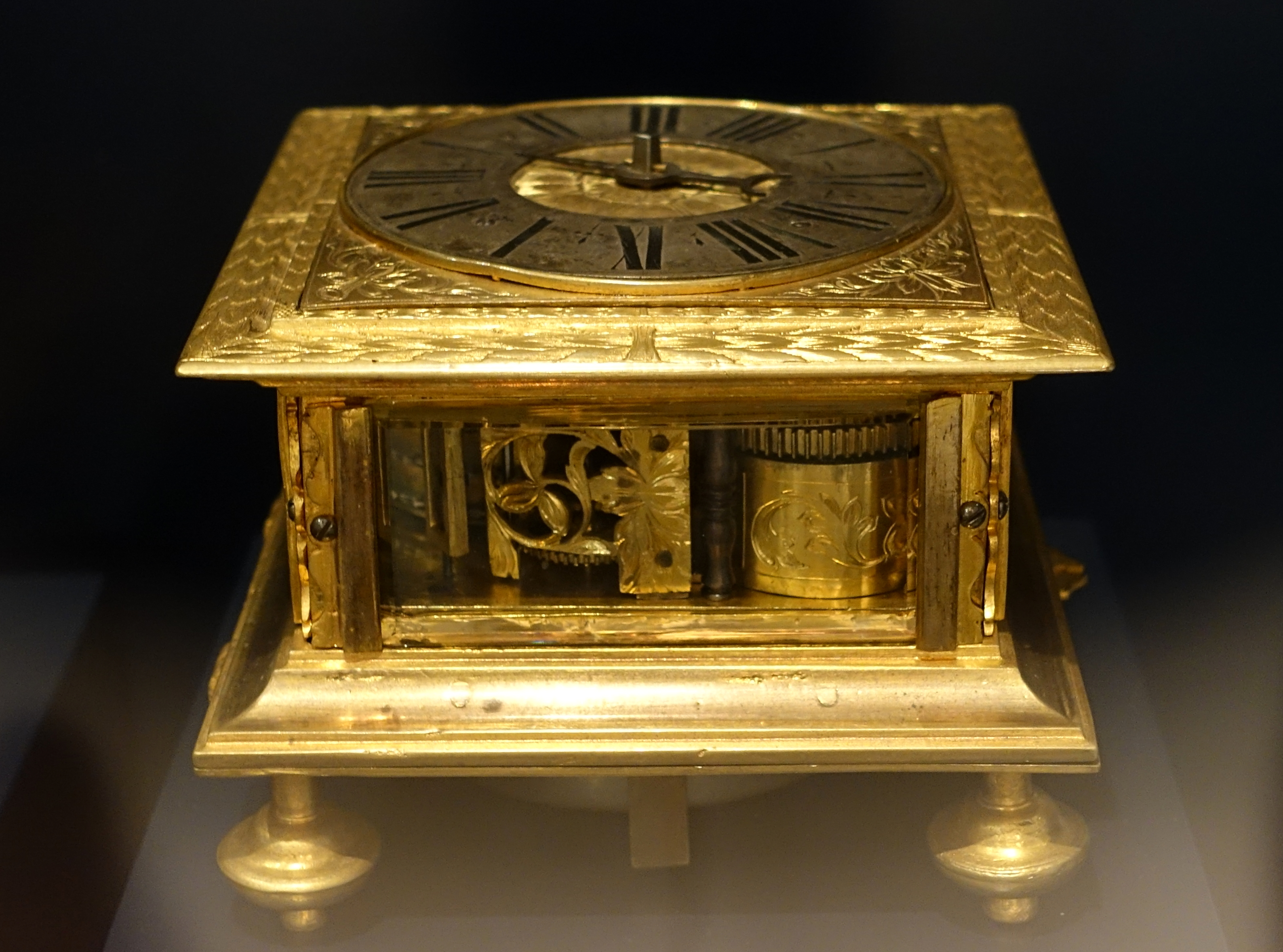
Table clock with single silver hand, signed Albrecht Erb

Albrecht Erb (1628–1714) was a notable Austrian clockmaker, active in Vienna, and a member of that city's council.

Erb worked primarily for Austria's court and municipalities, but he also received numerous orders from abroad, and was particularly known for his astronomical clocks. One of his principal works is owned by the Kunsthistorisches Museum in Vienna.
