= Cervical spinal nerve 6 =

Spinal nerve of the cervical segment

Cervical spinal nerve
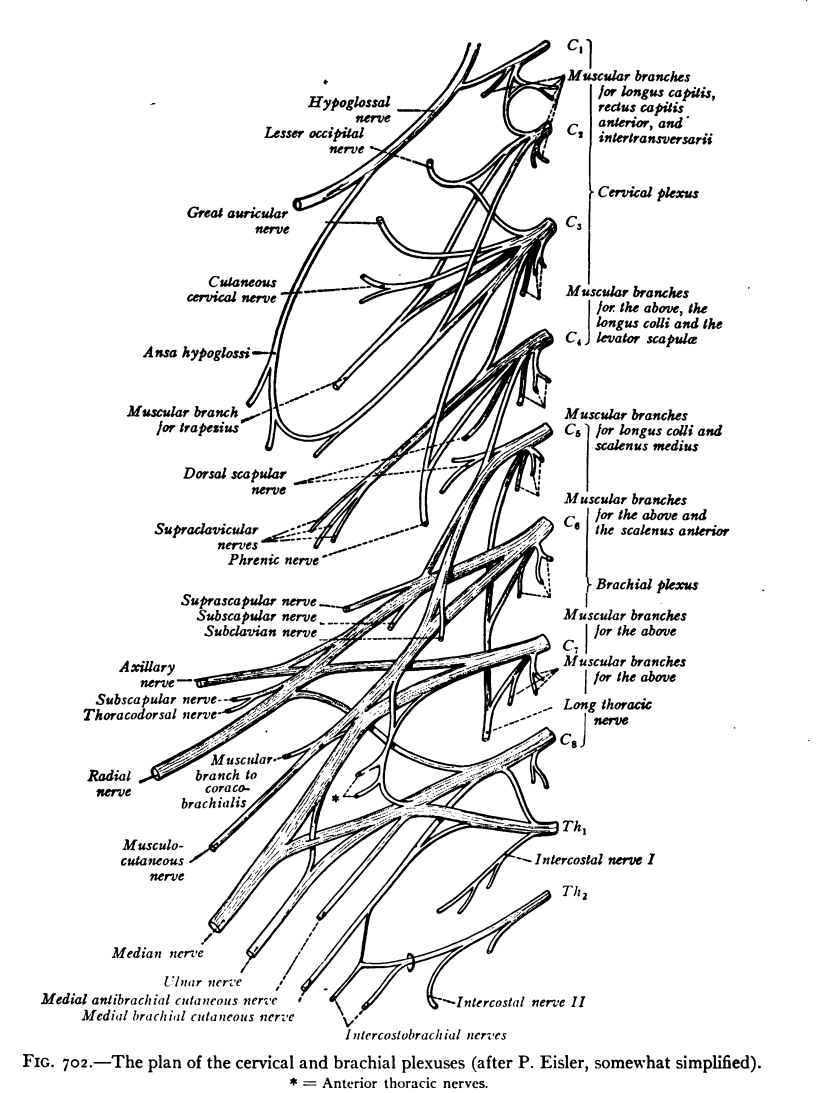
- The plan of the cervical and brachial plexuses.

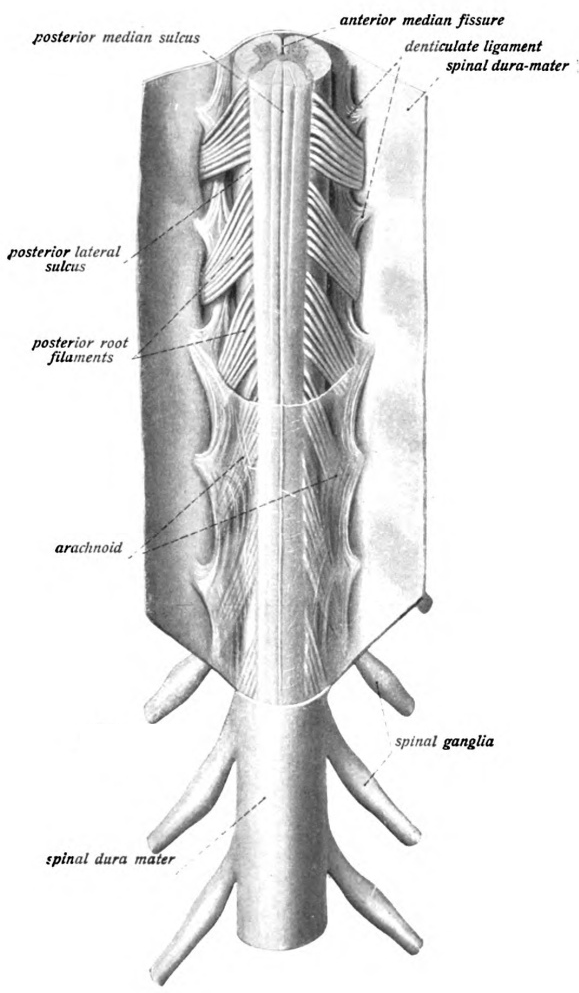
- The spinal cord with spinal nerves.

Details

Identifiers
- Latin: nervi spinalis
- FMA: 6447

The cervical spinal nerve 6 (C6) is a spinal nerve of the cervical segment.

It originates from the spinal column from above the cervical vertebra 6 (C6).

The C6 nerve root shares a common branch from C5, and has a role in innervating many muscles of the rotator cuff and distal arm, including:

- Subclavius
- Supraspinatus
- Infraspinatus
- Biceps brachii
- Brachialis
- Deltoid
- Teres minor
- Brachioradialis
- Serratus anterior
- Subscapularis
- Pectoralis major
- Coracobrachialis
- Teres major
- Supinator
- Extensor carpi radialis longus
- Latissimus dorsi

Damage to the C6 motor neuron, by way of impingement, ischemia, trauma, or degeneration of nerve tissue, can cause denervation of one or more of the associated muscles. Muscle atrophy and other secondary complications can occur.

== Additional images ==
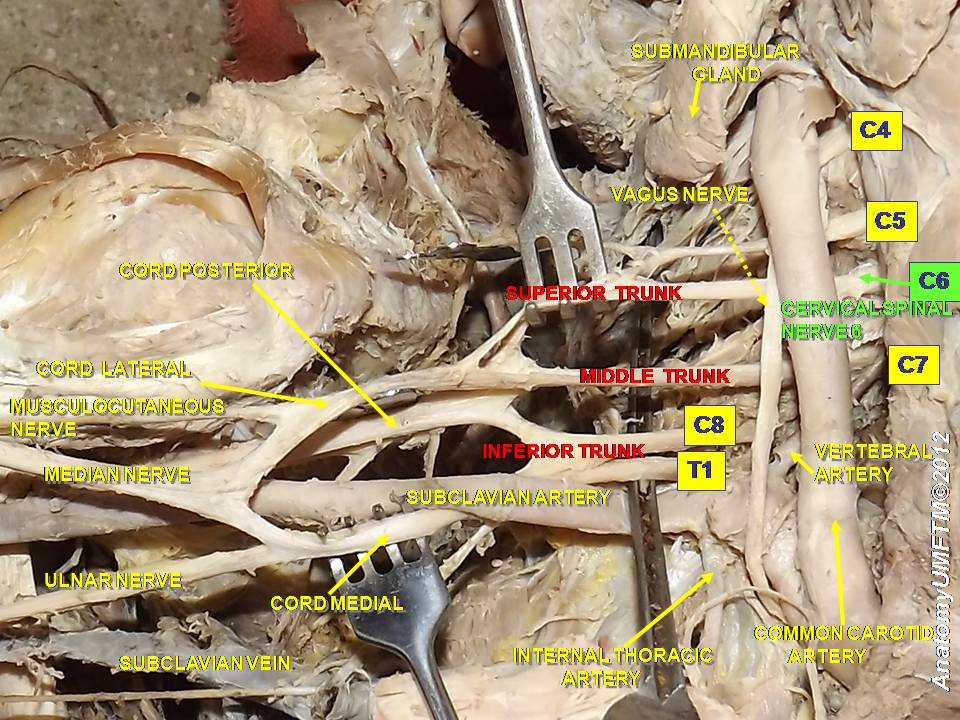
Cervical spinal nerve 6
