= Medial pectoral nerve =

Nerve of the human chest muscle

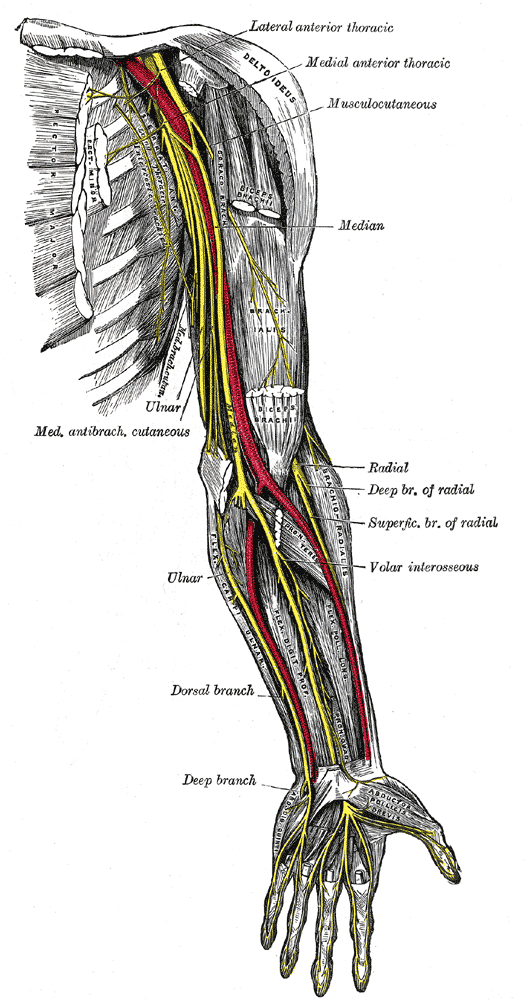
- Nerves of the left upper extremity. (Medial anterior thoracic visible in upper right.)

Details
- From: Medial cord
- Innervates: Pectoralis minor, pectoralis major

Identifiers
- Latin: nervus pectoralis medialis
- TA98: A14.2.03.017
- TA2: 6444
- FMA: 65293

The medial pectoral nerve (also known as the medial anterior thoracic nerve) is (typically) a branch of the medial cord of the brachial plexus and is derived from spinal nerve roots C8-T1. It provides motor innervation to the pectoralis minor muscle, and the lower half (sternal part) of the pectoralis major muscle. It runs along the inferior border of the pectoralis minor muscle.

Damage to the medial pectoral nerve can result in inability to elevate the shoulder.

== Anatomy ==
=== Origin ===
The medial pectoral nerve usually arises from the medial cord of the brachial plexus; it can however occasionally arise directly from the anterior division of the inferior trunk of the brachial plexus. It is derived from the eighth cervical (C8) and first thoracic (T1) spinal nerve roots.

The origin is situated posterior to the axillary artery.

=== Course and relations ===
It passes behind the first part of the axillary artery, curves forward between the axillary artery and vein, and unites in front of the artery with a filament from the lateral nerve.

It then enters the deep surface of the pectoralis minor muscle, where it divides into a number of branches, which supply the muscle.

Two or three branches pierce the muscle and end in the sternocostal head of the pectoralis major muscle. The medial pectoral nerve pierces both the pectoralis minor and the sternocostal head of the pectoralis major. The lateral pectoral nerve pierces only the clavicular head of the pectoralis major.

== Clinical relevance ==
The medial pectoral nerve can be used as a donor nerve when reconstructing a damaged brachial plexus, or axillary nerve.

== See also ==
- Lateral pectoral nerve

== Additional images ==
Brachial plexus

Brachial plexus with courses of spinal nerves shown
