= Lateral cord =

Peripheral neuroanatomic structure

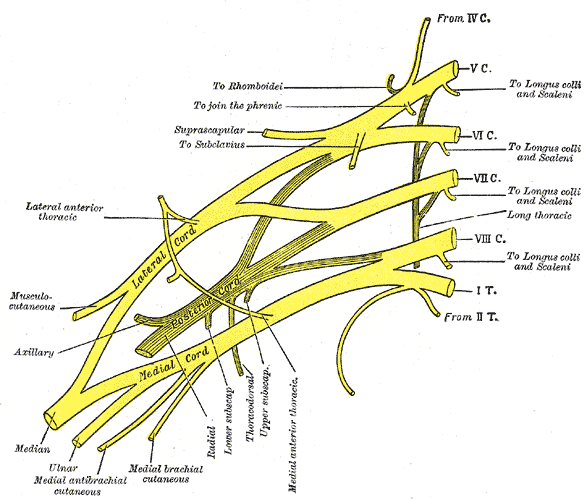
- Diagram of the brachial plexus. Lateral cord is labeled left of centre.

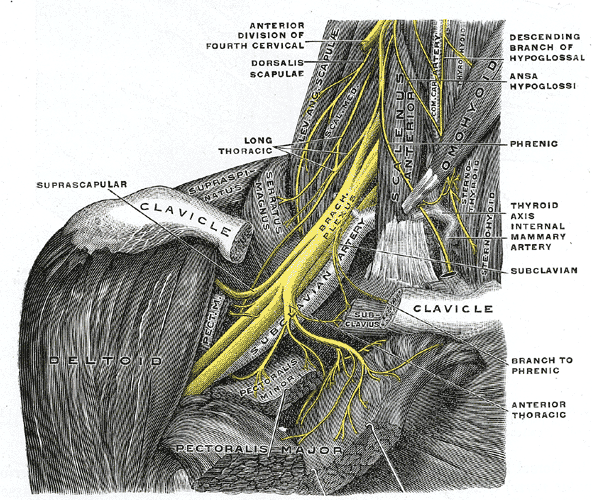
- The right brachial plexus with its short branches, viewed from in front. The Sternomastoid and Trapezius muscles have been completely, the Omohyoid and Subclavius have been partially, removed; a piece has been sawed out of the clavicle; the Pectoralis muscles have been incised and reflected.

Details
- From: Anterior divisions of the upper and middle trunks of the brachial plexus
- To: Lateral pectoral nerve musculocutaneous nerve lateral head of median nerve

Identifiers
- Latin: fasciculus lateralis plexus brachialis
- TA98: A14.2.03.021
- TA2: 6415
- FMA: 45235

The lateral cord is the part of the brachial plexus formed by the anterior divisions of the upper (C5-C6) and middle trunks (C7). Its name comes from it being lateral to the axillary artery as it passes through the axilla. The other cords of the brachial plexus are the posterior cord and medial cord.

The lateral cord gives rise to the following nerves from proximal to distal:

- lateral pectoral nerve (C5-C7)
- musculocutaneous nerve (C5-C7)
- lateral head of median nerve (C5-C7) [other part of median nerve comes from medial cord]

== Additional images ==
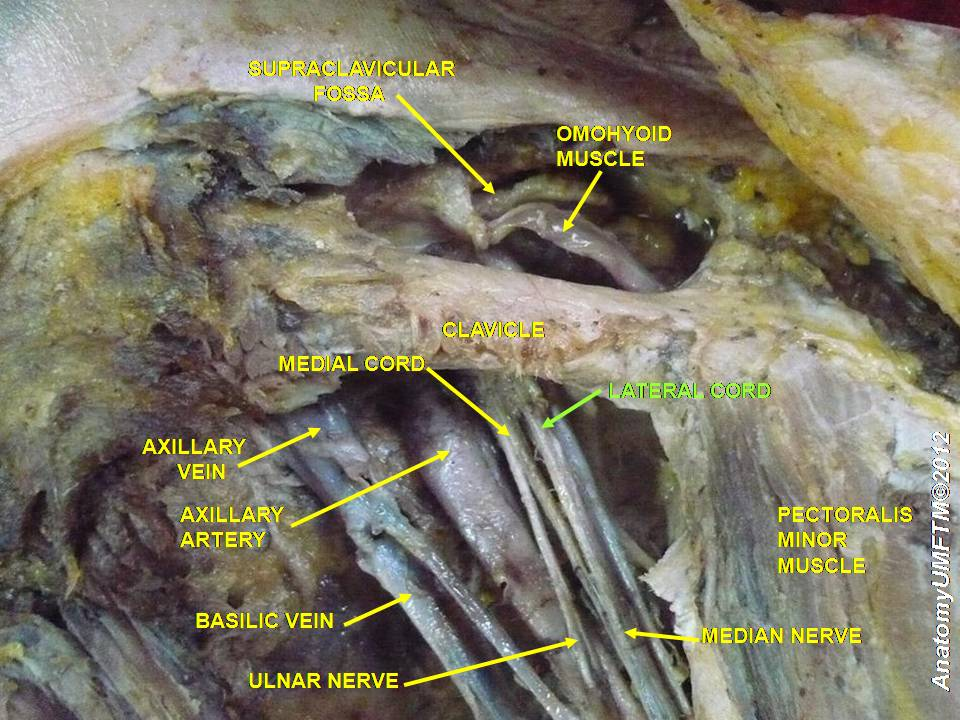
Lateral cord

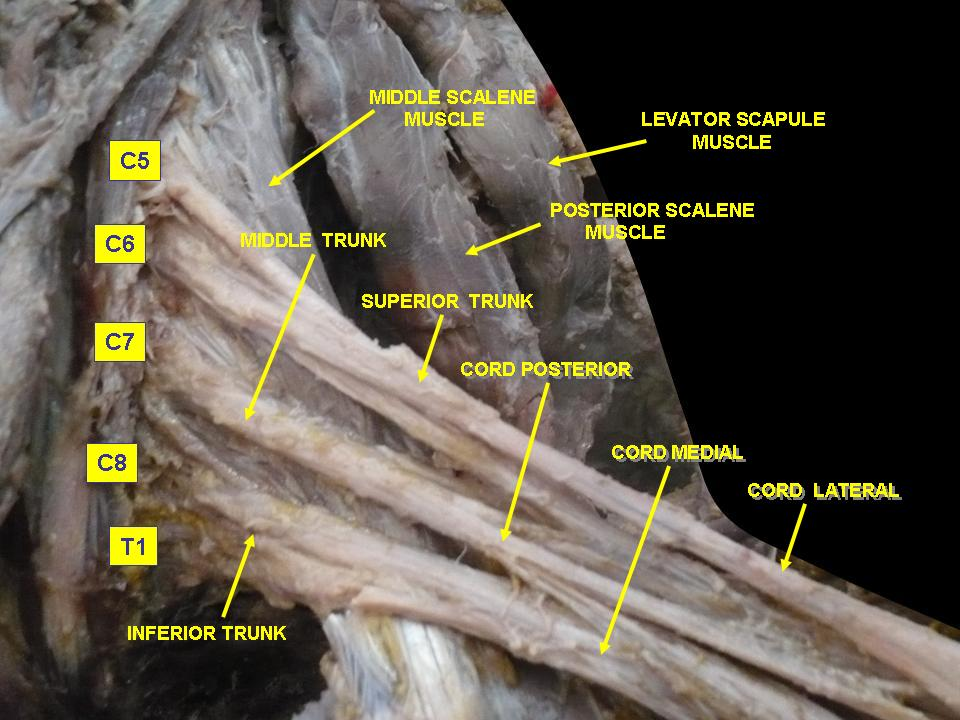
Brachial plexus.Deep dissection.
