= Lateral pectoral nerve =

Nerve of the human chest muscle

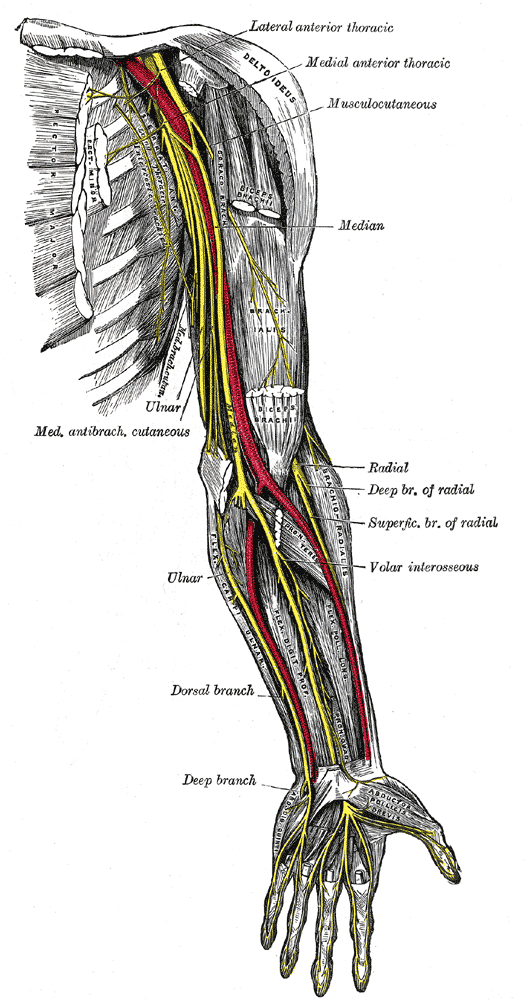
- Nerves of the left upper extremity. (Lateral anterior thoracic visible in upper right.)

Details
- From: Lateral cord
- Innervates: Pectoralis major

Identifiers
- Latin: nervus pectoralis lateralis
- TA98: A14.2.03.018
- TA2: 6419
- FMA: 65296

The lateral pectoral nerve (also known as the lateral anterior thoracic nerve) arises from the lateral cord of the brachial plexus, and through it from the C5-7.

It passes across the axillary artery and vein, pierces the clavipectoral (coracoclavicular) fascia, and enters the deep surface of the pectoralis major to innervate it.

== Function ==
The lateral pectoral nerve provides motor innervation to the pectoralis major muscle.

Although this nerve is described as mostly motor, it also has been considered to carry proprioceptive and nociceptive fibers. It arises either from the lateral cord or directly from the anterior divisions of the upper and middle trunks of the brachial plexus. This is unlike the medial pectoral nerve, which derives from the medial cord (or directly from the anterior division of the lower trunk). It splits into four to seven branches that pierce the clavipectoral fascia to innervate the entire pectoralis major or its superior portion.

The medial and lateral pectoral nerves form a connection, around the axillary artery, called the ansa pectoralis. The lateral pectoral nerve has been described as double, while the medial pectoral nerve has been described as single.

== Clinical significance ==
=== Postoperative Care ===
The lateral pectoral nerve is important in the pain response after breast augmentation and mastectomy, and especially in breast implant surgery, when the implant is inserted by the subpectoral route. The pectoral nerves can be anesthetized (blocked) intraoperatively by the surgeon under direct vision by three injections - one to block the medial pectoral nerve, the second to block the perforating branches of the medial pectoral nerve, and the third to block the lateral pectoral nerve. An ultrasound-guided pectoral nerve block can also be performed preventively before the operation by an anesthesiologist, experienced in regional anesthesia. It is safe and relies on ultrasound imaging to localize the pectoralis major and minor muscles, the presumed course of the pectoral nerves and the optimal spread of the local anesthetic.

==== Nerve Block ====
Blockade of the lateral pectoral nerve is helpful in cases such as shoulder dislocation and other orthopedic procedures, involving the shoulder. Spasms of the pectoralis major muscle and resulting severe pain (acute or chronic) may be reduced by pectoral nerve block or neuromuscular relaxation. Decreasing the pectoral muscle tone intraoperatively by neuromuscular relaxation (paralytic agents) or by a nerve block (local anesthetic injection), can facilitate better cosmetic results during breast augmentation or post-mastectomy breast implantation. “The skin projection point of the neurovascular bundle (NVB) represents the denervation point (DP).” The NVB (thoracoacromial artery and vein, plus the lateral pectoral nerve) may be the guide for local anesthetic applications in order to achieve pectoral muscle denervation. “Routine botulinum toxin infiltration of the chest wall musculature at the time of mastectomy and immediate reconstruction… would paralyze the muscles and reduce the postoperative pain caused by muscle spasm.”

=== Damage ===
The lateral pectoral nerve can be damaged, particularly during surgery, by cauterisation and avulsion. Trauma to the brachial plexus can cut off innervation to the lateral pectoral nerve.

== See also ==
- Medial pectoral nerve

== Additional images ==
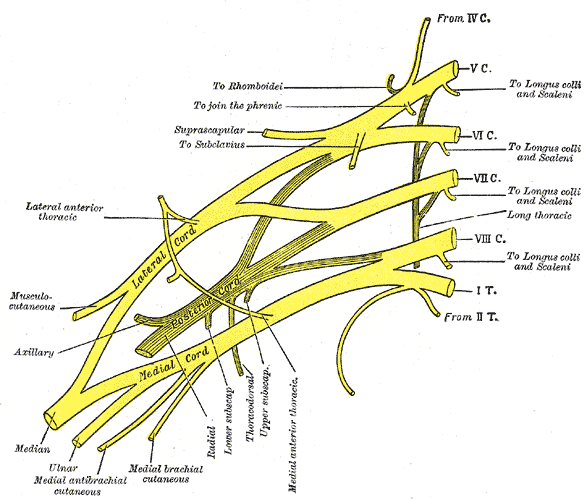
Plan of brachial plexus.

Brachial plexus

Schema of brachial plexus with course of spinal nerves shown.
