= Musculocutaneous nerve =

Nerve in the arm

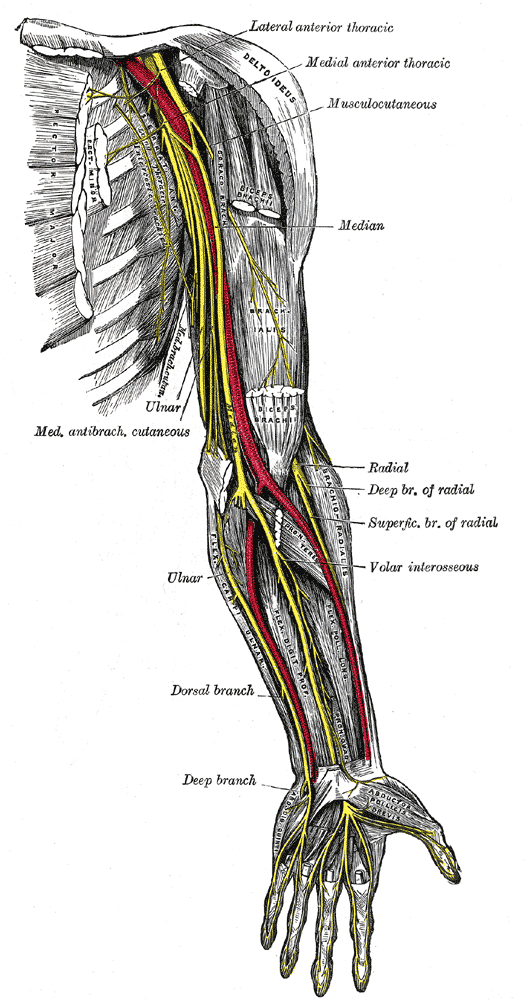
- Nerves of the left upper extremity. (Musculocutaneous labeled at upper right.)

Details
- From: Lateral cord (C5-C7)
- To: Lateral cutaneous nerve of forearm
- Innervates: Anterior compartment of the arm

Identifiers
- Latin: nervus musculocutaneus
- MeSH: D009138
- TA98: A14.2.03.024
- TA2: 6421
- FMA: 37064

The musculocutaneous nerve is a mixed branch of the lateral cord of the brachial plexus derived from cervical spinal nerves C5-C7. It arises opposite the lower border of the pectoralis minor. It provides motor innervation to the muscles of the anterior compartment of the arm: the coracobrachialis, biceps brachii, and brachialis. It provides sensory innervation to the lateral forearm (via its terminal branch). It courses through the anterior part of the arm, terminating 2 cm above elbow; after passing the lateral edge of the tendon of biceps brachii it is becomes known as the lateral cutaneous nerve of the forearm.

== Structure ==
=== Course ===
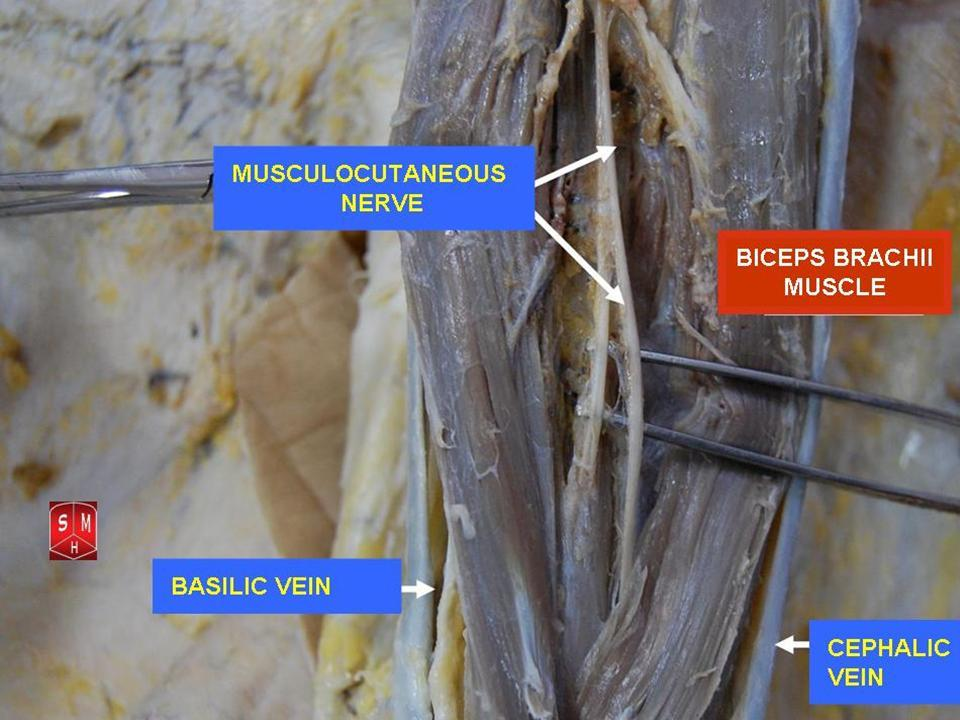
Musculocutaneous nerve on superficial dissection.

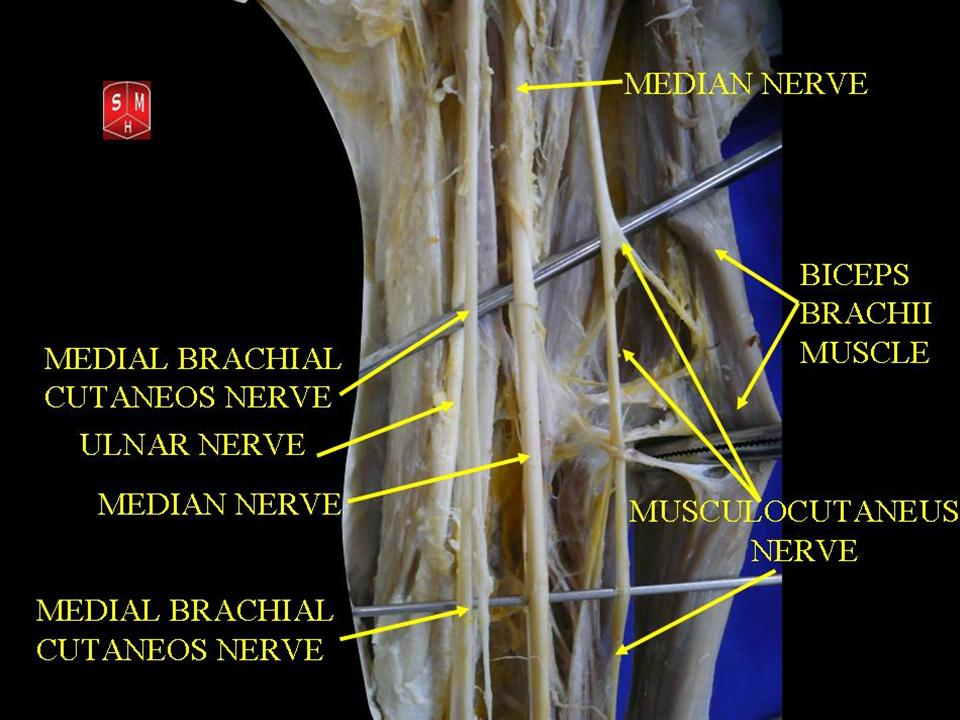
Musculocutaneous nerve on deep dissection.

Musculocutaneous nerve arises from the lateral cord of the brachial plexus with root value of C5 to C7 of the spinal cord. It follows the course of the third part of the axillary artery (part of the axillary artery distal to the pectoralis minor) laterally and enters the frontal aspect of the arm where it penetrates the coracobrachialis muscle. It then passes downwards and laterally between the biceps brachii (above) and the brachialis muscles (below), to the lateral side of the arm; at 2 cm above the elbow it pierces the deep fascia lateral to the tendon of the biceps brachii and is continued into the forearm as the lateral cutaneous nerve of the forearm.

=== Distribution ===
==== Motor innervation ====
In its course through the arm it innervates the coracobrachialis, biceps brachii, and the greater part of the brachialis.

==== Sensory innervation ====
Its terminal branch, the lateral cutaneous nerve of the forearm, supplies the sensation of the lateral side of the forearm from the elbow to the wrist.

The musculocutaneous nerve also gives articular branches to the elbow joint and to the humerus.

=== Variation ===
The musculocutaneous nerve presents frequent variations and communications with the median nerve.

1. It may adhere for some distance to the median and then pass outward, beneath the biceps brachii, instead of through the coracobrachialis.
2. Some of the fibers of the median may run for some distance in the musculocutaneous and then leave it to join their proper trunk; less frequently the reverse is the case, and the median sends a branch to join the musculocutaneous.
3. The nerve may pass under the coracobrachialis or through the biceps brachii.
4. Occasionally it gives a filament to the pronator teres, and it supplies the dorsal surface of the thumb when the superficial branch of the radial nerve is absent.

== Nerve injuries ==
Injury to the musculocutaneous nerve can be caused by three mechanisms: repeated microtrauma, indirect trauma or direct trauma on the nerve. Overuse of coracobrachialis, biceps, and brachialis muscles can cause the stretching or compression of musculocutaneous nerve. Those who have it, can complain of pain, tingling or reduced sensation over the lateral side of the forearm. This symptom can be reproduced by pressing over the region below the coracoid process (positive Tinel's sign). Pain can also be reproduced by flexing the arm against resistance. Other differential diagnoses that can mimick the symptoms of musculocutaneous palsy are: C6 radiculopathy (pain can be produced by movement of the neck), long head of biceps tendinopathy (no motor or sensory deficits), pain of the bicipital groove (relieved by shoulder joint injection). Electromyography test shows slight neural damage at the biceps and the brachialis muscles with slower motor and sensory conduction over the Erb's point.

In indirect trauma, violent abduction and retroposition of the shoulder can stretch the nerve and result tension of the coracobrachialis with musculocutaneous nerve lesion. Those with this type of lesion is presented with pain, reduced sensation, and tingling of the lateral part of forearm (lateral antebrachial cutaneous nerve - terminal sensory only branch of musculocutaneous nerve) with reduced strength of elbow flexion. Tinel's sign can be positive. Differential diagnosis includes C5 and C6 nerve root lesions of the brachial plexus where the abduction, external rotation, and elbow flexion is lost. On the other hand, rupture of the biceps can cause the loss of flexion of the elbow without sensory deficits. Rupture of the SHORT HEAD of the biceps can decrease elbow flexion strength, where the brachialis muscle is intact. Rupture of the LONG HEAD of the biceps results in mild weakening of forearm supination as long as the supinator muscle is intact. Electromyography test is negative.

In direct trauma, fracture of the humerus, gun shot, glass pieces injuries and more, can cause the musculocutaneous nerve lesion.

Iatrogenic nerve injuries (for example during orthopedic surgery involving an internal fixation of the humerus) are relatively common and in a certain percentage of cases probably inevitable, though an adequate knowledge of the surgical anatomy can help to reduce its frequency.

To diagnose traumatic nerve injury, operative exploration should be performed without delay. If reconstruction of the motor function of the musculocutaneous nerve (elbow flexion) is needed then there are several options, depending on the injury pattern and timeframes. If the nerve is in-continuity and the fascicles appear healthy under the operating microscope then Neurolysis may be sufficient. When there is a division or segment of non-viable nerve then interpositional autografting is preferred. If reinnervation is likely to take months (e.g. if the injured segment is long and long grafts are needed, or in the case of proximal injuries such as root avulsion or upper trunk injury) then nerve transfer is preferred as this will reinnervate the muscle faster; in the case of upper trunk injuries, the ideal neurotisation appears to be the double Oberlin transfer., although data on this topic are sparse and heterogeneous.
