= Upper limb =

Consists of the arm, forearm, and hand

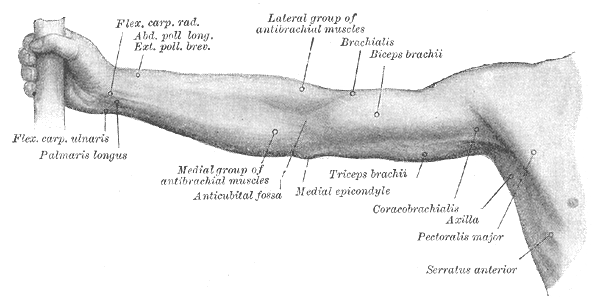
- Front of right upper extremity.

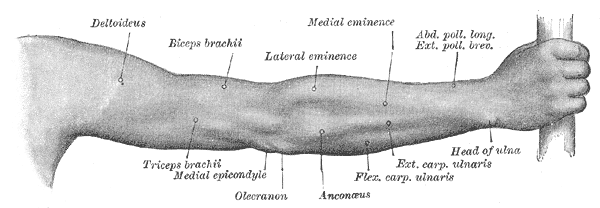
- Back of right upper extremity.

Details
- System: Musculoskeletal

Identifiers
- Latin: membrum superius
- MeSH: D034941
- TA98: A01.1.00.019
- TA2: 138
- FMA: 7183

The upper limbs or upper extremities are the forelimbs of an upright-postured tetrapod vertebrate, extending from the scapulae and clavicles down to and including the digits, including all the musculatures and ligaments involved with the shoulder, elbow, wrist and knuckle joints. In humans, each upper limb is divided into the shoulder, arm, elbow, forearm, wrist and hand, and is primarily used for climbing, lifting and manipulating objects. In anatomy, just as arm refers to the upper arm, leg refers to the lower leg.

== Definition ==
In formal usage, the term "arm" only refers to the structures from the shoulder to the elbow, explicitly excluding the forearm, and thus "upper limb" and "arm" are not synonymous. However, in casual usage, the terms are often used interchangeably. The term "upper arm" is redundant in anatomy, but in informal usage is used to distinguish between the two terms.

== Structure ==
In the human body, the muscles of the upper limb can be classified by origin, topography, function, or innervation. While a grouping by innervation reveals embryological and phylogenetic origins, the functional-topographical classification below reflects the similarity in action between muscles (with the exception of the shoulder girdle, where muscles with similar action can vary considerably in their location and orientation.

=== Musculoskeletal system ===
==== Shoulder girdle ====
Bones of the shoulder girdle

The shoulder girdle or pectoral girdle, composed of the clavicle and the scapula, connects the upper limb to the axial skeleton through the sternoclavicular joint (the only joint in the upper limb that directly articulates with the trunk), a ball and socket joint supported by the subclavius muscle which acts as a dynamic ligament. While this muscle prevents dislocation in the joint, strong forces tend to break the clavicle instead. The acromioclavicular joint, the joint between the acromion process on the scapula and the clavicle, is similarly strengthened by strong ligaments, especially the coracoclavicular ligament which prevents excessive lateral and medial movements. Between them these two joints allow a wide range of movements for the shoulder girdle, much because of the lack of a bone-to-bone contact between the scapula and the axial skeleton. The pelvic girdle is, in contrast, firmly fixed to the axial skeleton, which increases stability and load-bearing capabilities.

The mobility of the shoulder girdle is supported by a large number of muscles. The most important of these are muscular sheets rather than fusiform or strap-shaped muscles and they thus never act in isolation but with some fibres acting in coordination with fibres in other muscles.

Muscles
of shoulder girdle excluding the glenohumeral joint

Migrated from head
Trapezius, sternocleidomastoideus, omohyoideus
Posterior
Rhomboideus major, rhomboideus minor, levator scapulae
Anterior
Subclavius, pectoralis minor, serratus anterior

==== Shoulder joint ====
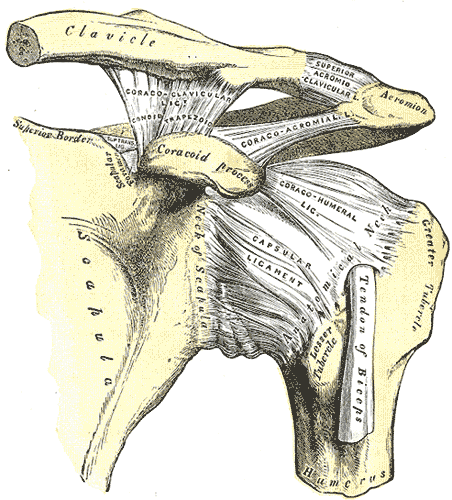
Shoulder joint with ligaments

The glenohumeral joint (colloquially called the shoulder joint) is the highly mobile ball and socket joint between the glenoid cavity of the scapula and the head of the humerus. Lacking the passive stabilisation offered by ligaments in other joints, the glenohumeral joint is actively stabilised by the rotator cuff, a group of short muscles stretching from the scapula to the humerus. Little inferior support is available to the joint and dislocation of the shoulder almost exclusively occurs in this direction.

The large muscles acting at this joint perform multiple actions and seemingly simple movements are often the result of composite antagonist and protagonist actions from several muscles. For example, pectoralis major is the most important arm flexor and latissimus dorsi the most important extensor at the glenohumeral joint, but, acting together, these two muscles cancel each other's action leaving only their combined medial rotation component. On the other hand, to achieve pure flexion at the joint the deltoid and supraspinatus must cancel the adduction component and the teres minor and infraspinatus the medial rotation component of pectoralis major. Similarly, abduction (moving the arm away from the body) is performed by different muscles at different stages. The first 10° is performed entirely by the supraspinatus, but beyond that fibres of the much stronger deltoid are in position to take over the work until 90°. To achieve the full 180° range of abduction the arm must be rotated medially and the scapula most be rotated about itself to direct the glenoid cavity upward.

Muscles
of shoulder joint proper

Posterior
Supraspinatus, infraspinatus, teres minor, subscapularis, deltoideus, latissimus dorsi, teres major
Anterior
Pectoralis major, coracobrachialis

==== Bones of upper limb ====
The bones forming the human upper limb are

- Clavicle
- Scapula
- Humerus
- Radius
- Ulna
- Carpal bones
  - Scaphoid
  - Lunate
  - Triquetral
  - Pisiform
  - Trapezium
  - Trapezoid
  - Capitate
  - Hamate
- 5 Metacarpal bones
- 14 Phalanges

Upper limb bones with articular cartilage

==== Arm ====
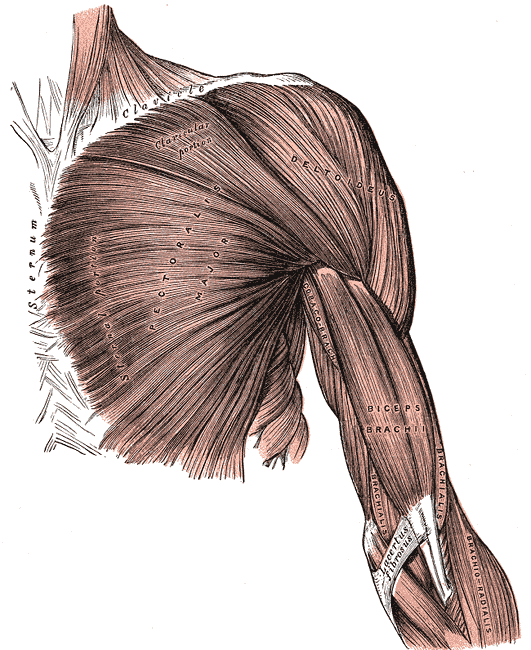
Superficial muscles of the arm

The arm proper (brachium), sometimes called the upper arm, the region between the shoulder and the elbow, is composed of the humerus with the elbow joint at its distal end.

The elbow joint is a complex of three joints — the humeroradial, humeroulnar, and superior radioulnar joints — the former two allowing flexion and extension whilst the latter, together with its inferior namesake, allows supination and pronation at the wrist. Triceps is the major extensor and brachialis and biceps the major flexors. Biceps is, however, the major supinator and while performing this action it ceases to be an effective flexor at the elbow.

Muscles
of the arm

Posterior
Triceps brachii, anconeus
Anterior
Brachialis, biceps brachii

==== Forearm ====
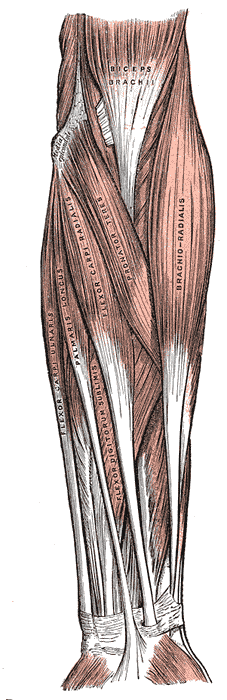
Ventral superficial muscles of the forearm

The forearm (Latin: antebrachium), composed of the radius and ulna; the latter is the main distal part of the elbow joint, while the former composes the main proximal part of the wrist joint.

Most of the large number of muscles in the forearm are divided into the wrist, hand, and finger extensors on the dorsal side (back of hand) and the ditto flexors in the superficial layers on the ventral side (side of palm). These muscles are attached to either the lateral or medial epicondyle of the humerus. They thus act on the elbow, but, because their origins are located close to the centre of rotation of the elbow, they mainly act distally at the wrist and hand. Exceptions to this simple division are brachioradialis — a strong elbow flexor — and palmaris longus — a weak wrist flexor which mainly acts to tense the palmar aponeurosis. The deeper flexor muscles are extrinsic hand muscles; strong flexors at the finger joints used to produce the important power grip of the hand, whilst forced extension is less useful and the corresponding extensor thus are much weaker.

Biceps is the major supinator (drive a screw in with the right arm) and pronator teres and pronator quadratus the major pronators (unscrewing) — the latter two role the radius around the ulna (hence the name of the first bone) and the former reverses this action assisted by supinator. Because biceps is much stronger than its opponents, supination is a stronger action than pronation (hence the direction of screws).

Muscles
of the forearm

Posterior
(Superficial) extensor digitorum, extensor digiti minimi, extensor carpi ulnaris, (deep) supinator, abductor pollicis longus, extensor pollicis brevis, extensor pollicis longus, extensor indicis
Anterior
(Superficial) pronator teres, flexor digitorum superficialis, flexor carpi radialis, flexor carpi ulnaris, palmaris longus, (deep) flexor digitorum profundus, flexor pollicis longus, pronator quadratus
Radial
Brachioradialis, extensor carpi radialis longus, extensor carpi radialis brevis

==== Wrist ====
The wrist (Latin: carpus), composed of the carpal bones, articulates at the wrist joint (or radiocarpal joint) proximally and the carpometacarpal joint distally. The wrist can be divided into two components separated by the midcarpal joints. The small movements of the eight carpal bones during composite movements at the wrist are complex to describe, but flexion mainly occurs in the midcarpal joint whilst extension mainly occurs in the radiocarpal joint; the latter joint also providing most of adduction and abduction at the wrist.

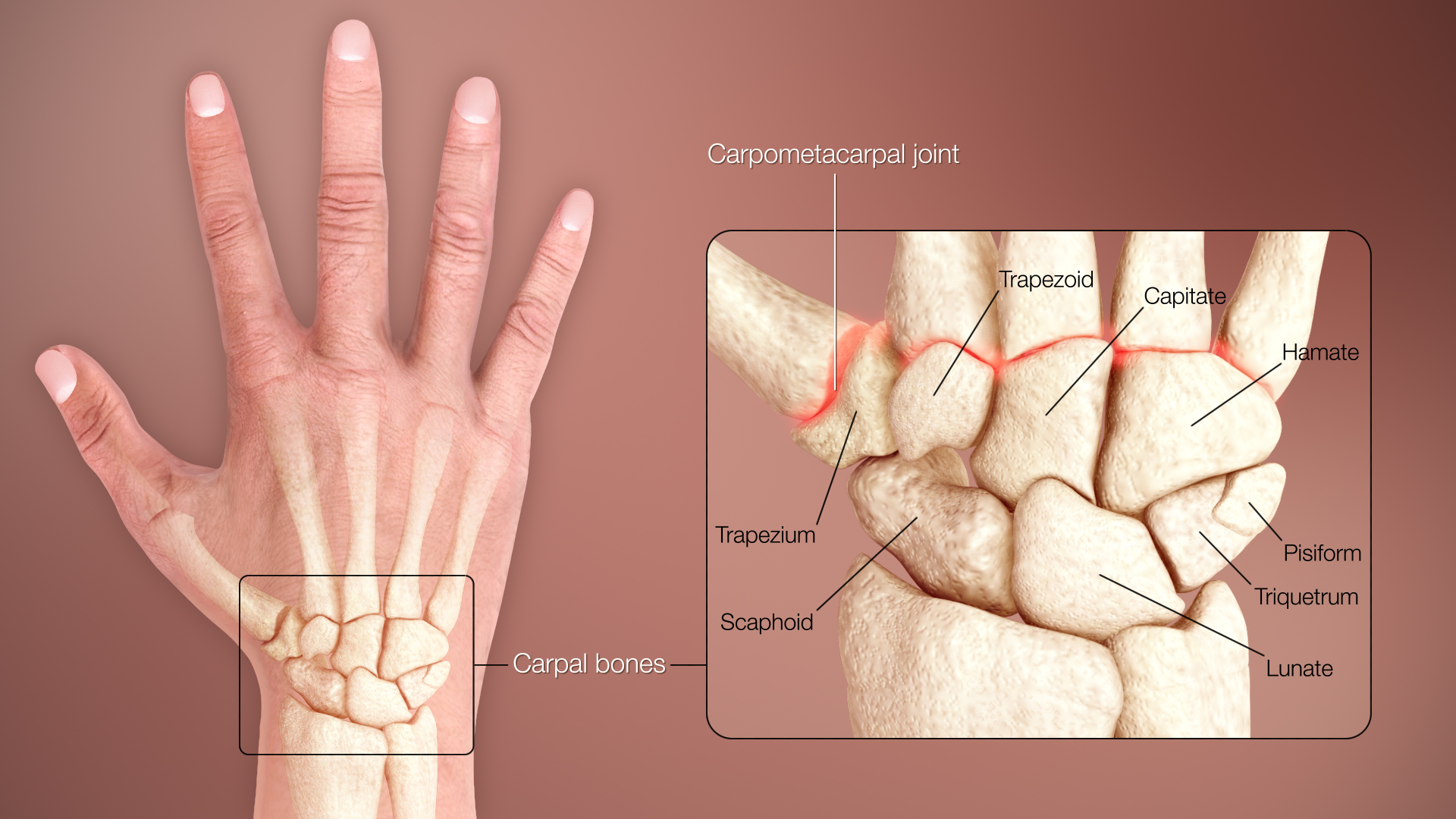
3D medical animation still shot of human wrist

How muscles act on the wrist is complex to describe. The five muscles acting on the wrist directly — flexor carpi radialis, flexor carpi ulnaris, extensor carpi radialis, extensor carpi ulnaris, and palmaris longus — are accompanied by the tendons of the extrinsic hand muscles (i.e. the muscles acting on the fingers). Thus, every movement at the wrist is the work of a group of muscles; because the four primary wrist muscles (FCR, FCU, ECR, and ECU) are attached to the four corners of the wrist, they also produce a secondary movement (i.e. ulnar or radial deviation). To produce pure flexion or extension at the wrist, these muscle therefore must act in pairs to cancel out each other's secondary action. On the other hand, finger movements without the corresponding wrist movements require the wrist muscles to cancel out the contribution from the extrinsic hand muscles at the wrist.

==== Hand ====
Bones of the hand

The hand (Latin: manus), the metacarpals (in the hand proper) and the phalanges of the fingers, form the metacarpophalangeal joints (MCP, including the knuckles) and interphalangeal joints (IP).

Of the joints between the carpus and metacarpus, the carpometacarpal joints, only the saddle-shaped joint of the thumb offers a high degree of mobility while the opposite is true for the metacarpophalangeal joints. The joints of the fingers are simple hinge joints.

The primary role of the hand itself is grasping and manipulation; tasks for which the hand has been adapted to two main grips — power grip and precision grip. In a power grip an object is held against the palm and in a precision grip an object is held with the fingers, both grips are performed by intrinsic and extrinsic hand muscles together. Most importantly, the relatively strong thenar muscles of the thumb and the thumb's flexible first joint allow the special opposition movement that brings the distal thumb pad in direct contact with the distal pads of the other four digits. Opposition is a complex combination of thumb flexion and abduction that also requires the thumb to be rotated 90° about its own axis. Without this complex movement, humans would not be able to perform a precision grip.

In addition, the central group of intrinsic hand muscles give important contributions to human dexterity. The palmar and dorsal interossei adduct and abduct at the MCP joints and are important in pinching. The lumbricals, attached to the tendons of the flexor digitorum profundus (FDP) and extensor digitorum communis (FDC), flex the MCP joints while extending the IP joints and allow a smooth transfer of forces between these two muscles while extending and flexing the fingers.

Muscles
of the hand

Metacarpal
Lumbricals, palmar introssei, dorsal interossei
Thenar
Abductor pollicis brevis, adductor pollicis, flexor pollicis brevis, opponens pollicis
Hypothenar
Abductor digiti minimi, flexor digiti minimi, opponens digiti minimi, palmaris brevis

=== Neurovascular system ===
==== Nerve supply ====
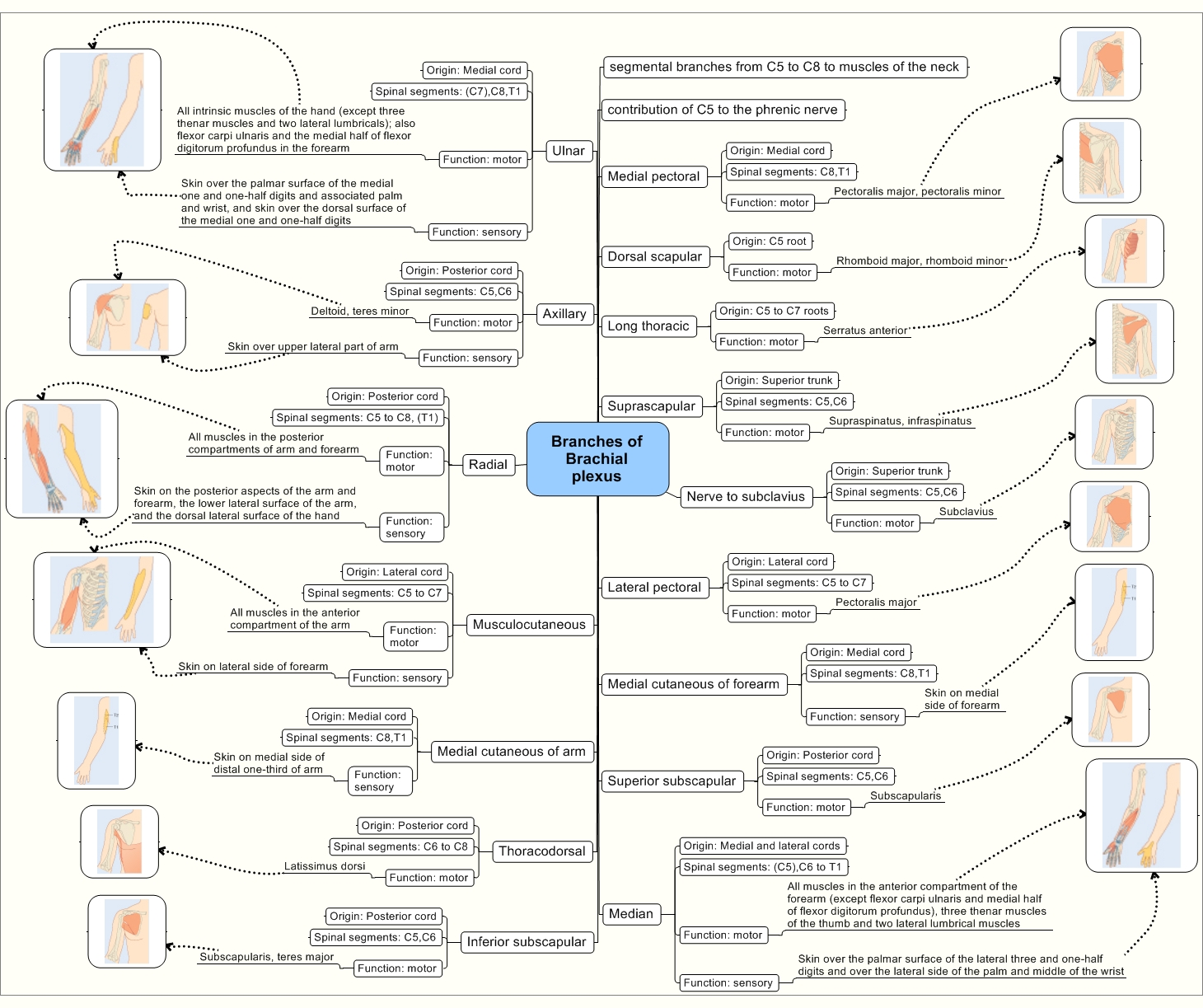
Branches of brachial plexus

The motor and sensory supply of the upper limb is provided by the brachial plexus which is formed by the ventral rami of spinal nerves C5-T1. In the posterior triangle of the neck these rami form three trunks from which fibers enter the axilla region (armpit) to innervate the muscles of the anterior and posterior compartments of the limb. In the axilla, cords are formed to split into branches, including the five terminal branches listed below. The muscles of the upper limb are innervated segmentally proximal to distal so that the proximal muscles are innervated by higher segments (C5–C6) and the distal muscles are innervated by lower segments (C8–T1).

Motor innervation of upper limb by the five terminal nerves of the brachial plexus:

- The musculocutaneous nerve innervates all the muscles of the anterior compartment of the arm.
- The median nerve innervates all the muscles of the anterior compartment of the forearm except flexor carpi ulnaris and the ulnar part of the flexor digitorum profundus. It also innervates the three thenar muscles and the first and second lumbricals.
- The ulnar nerve innervates the muscles of the forearm and hand not innervated by the median nerve.
- The axillary nerve innervates the deltoid and teres minor.
- The radial nerve innervates the posterior muscles of the arm and forearm

Collateral branches of the brachial plexus:

- The dorsal scapular nerve innervates rhomboid major, minor and levator scapulae .
- The long thoracic nerve innervates serratus anterior.
- The suprascapular nerve innervates supraspinatus and infraspinatus
- The lateral pectoral nerve innervates pectoralis major
- The medial pectoral nerve innervates pectoralis major and minor
- The upper subscapular nerve innervates subscapularis
- The thoracodorsal nerve innervates latissimus dorsi
- The lower subscapular nerve innervates subscapularis and teres major
- The medial brachial cutaneous nerve innervates the skin of medial arm
- The medial antebrachial cutaneous nerve innervates the skin of medial forearm

==== Blood supply and drainage ====
Arteries of the upper limb:

- The superior thoracic, thoracoacromial, posterior circumflex humeral and subscapular branches of the axillary artery.
- The deep brachial, superior ulnar collateral, inferior ulnar collateral, radial,

ulnar, nutrient and muscular branches of the brachial artery.

- The radial recurrent, muscular, superficial palmar, dorsal carpal, princeps pollicis and radialis indicis branches of the radial artery.
- The anterior ulnar recurrent, posterior ulnar recurrent, anterior interosseous, posterior interosseous and superficial branches of the ulnar artery.

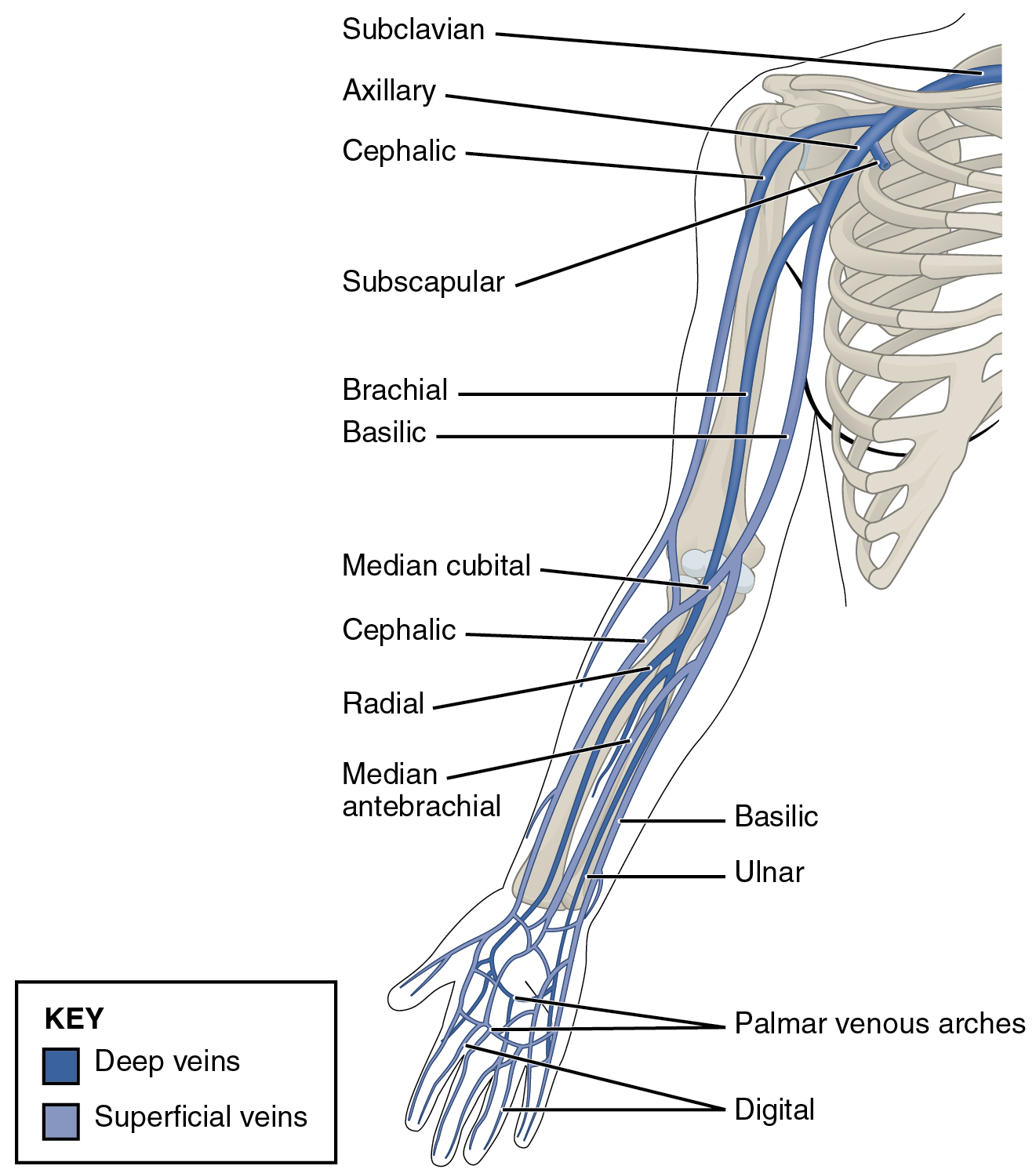
Veins of the upper limb.

Veins of the upper limb:

- Basilic vein
- Cephalic vein
- Median cubital vein
- Median antebrachial vein
- Dorsal venous arch

As for the upper limb blood supply, there are many anatomical variations.

== Other animals ==
=== Evolutionary variation ===
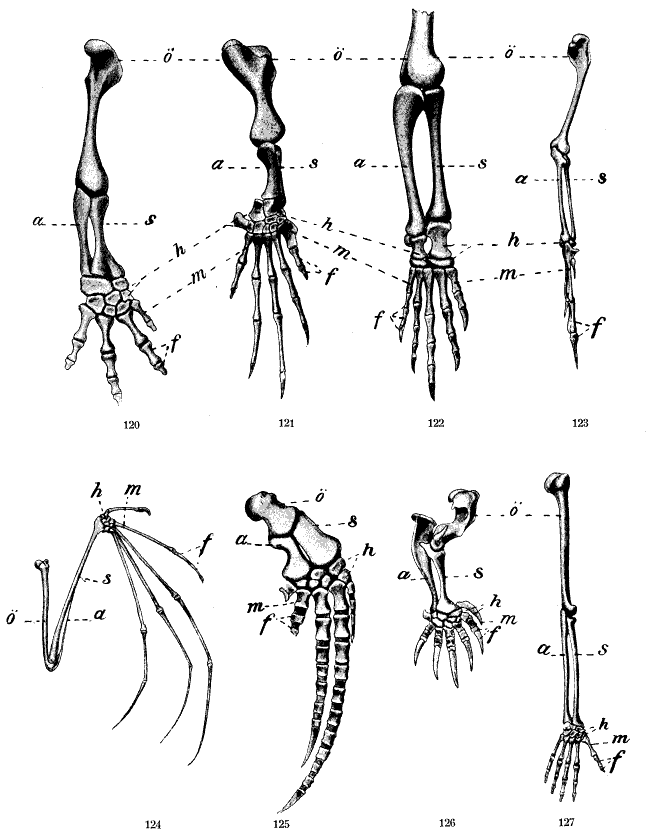
Upper/front limbs of (top) salamander, sea turtle, crocodile, bird, (bottom) bat, whale, mole, and human

The skeletons of all mammals are based on a common pentadactyl ("five-fingered") template but optimised for different functions. While many mammals can perform other tasks using their forelimbs, their primary use in most terrestrial mammals is one of three main modes of locomotion: unguligrade (hoof walkers), digitigrade (toe walkers), and plantigrade (sole walkers). Generally, the forelimbs are optimised for speed and stamina, but in some mammals some of the locomotion optimisation have been sacrificed for other functions, such as digging and grasping.

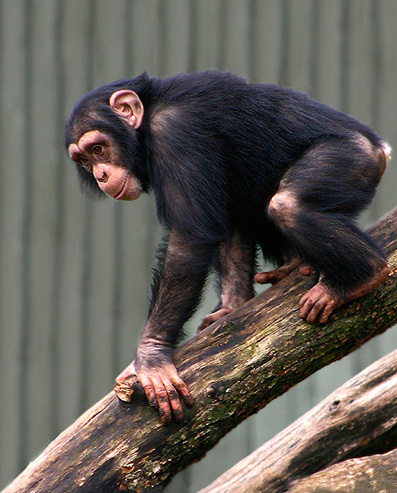
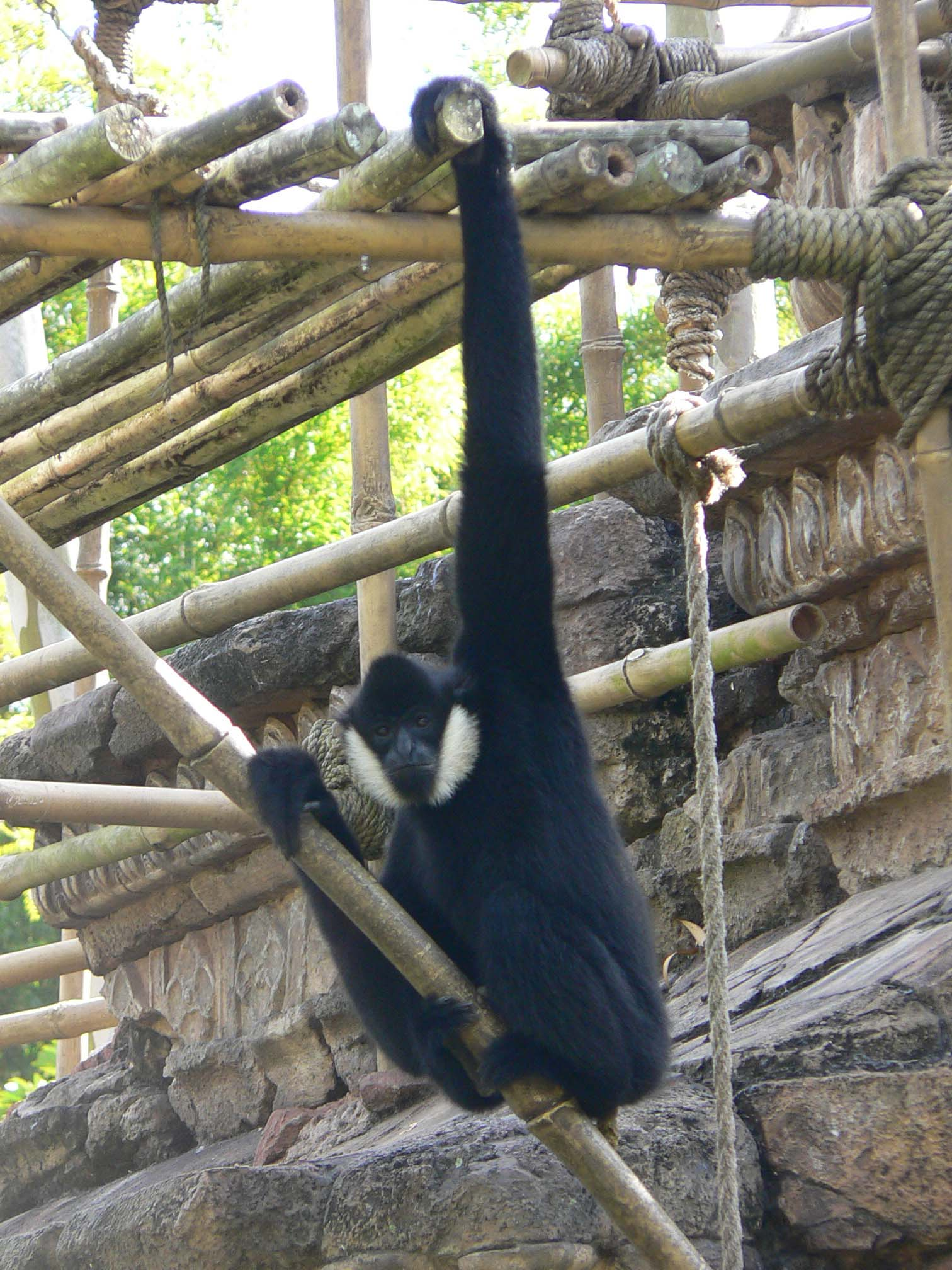
Chimpanzees maintain some of the dexterity brachiating gibbons lack

In primates, the upper limbs provide a wide range of movement which increases manual dexterity. The limbs of chimpanzees, compared to those of humans, reveal their different lifestyle. The chimpanzee primarily uses two modes of locomotion: knuckle-walking, a style of quadrupedalism in which the body weight is supported on the knuckles (or more properly on the middle phalanges of the fingers), and brachiation (swinging from branch to branch), a style of bipedalism in which flexed fingers are used to grasp branches above the head. To meet the requirements of these styles of locomotion, the chimpanzee's finger phalanges are longer and have more robust insertion areas for the flexor tendons while the metacarpals have transverse ridges to limit dorsiflexion (stretching the fingers towards the back of the hand). The thumb is small enough to facilitate brachiation while maintaining some of the dexterity offered by an opposable thumb. In contrast, virtually all locomotion functionality has been lost in humans while predominant brachiators, such as the gibbons, have very reduced thumbs and inflexible wrists.

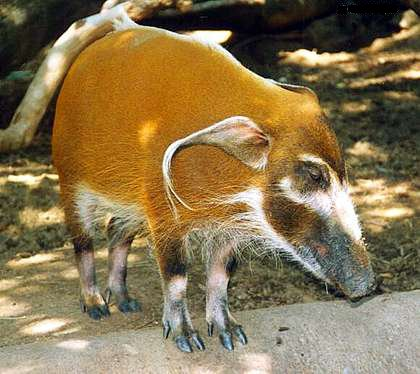
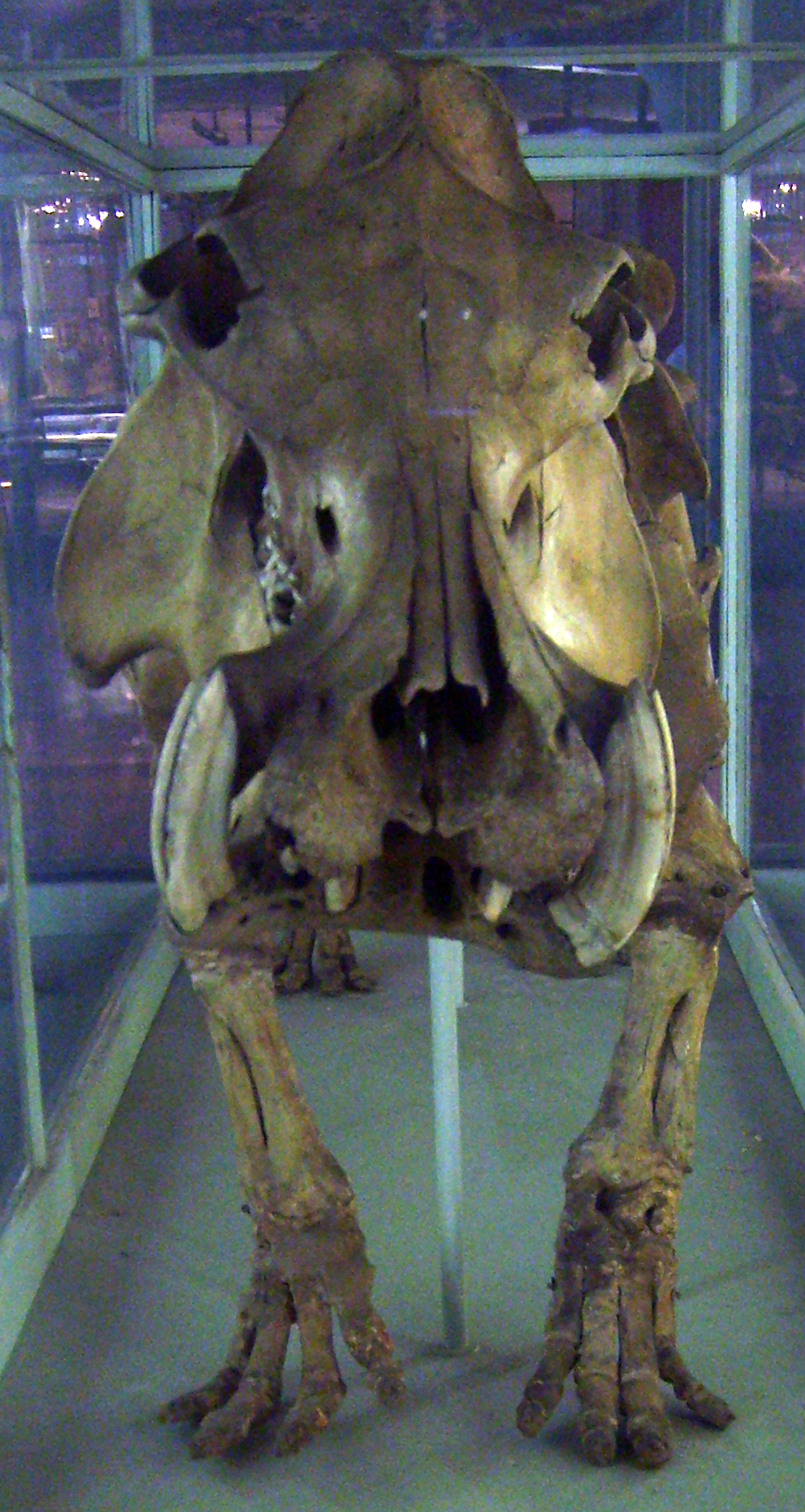
A bush pig, an ungulate with remaining non-weight-bearing digits, and the skeleton of the extinct Malagasy hippopotamus

In ungulates the forelimbs are optimised to maximize speed and stamina to the extent that the limbs serve almost no other purpose. In contrast to the skeleton of human limbs, the proximal bones of ungulates are short and the distal bones long to provide length of stride; proximally, large and short muscles provide rapidity of step. The odd-toed ungulates, such as the horse, use a single third toe for weight-bearing and have significantly reduced metacarpals. Even-toed ungulates, such as the giraffe, uses both their third and fourth toes but a single completely fused phalanx bone for weight-bearing. Ungulates whose habitat does not require fast running on hard terrain, for example the hippopotamus, have maintained four digits.

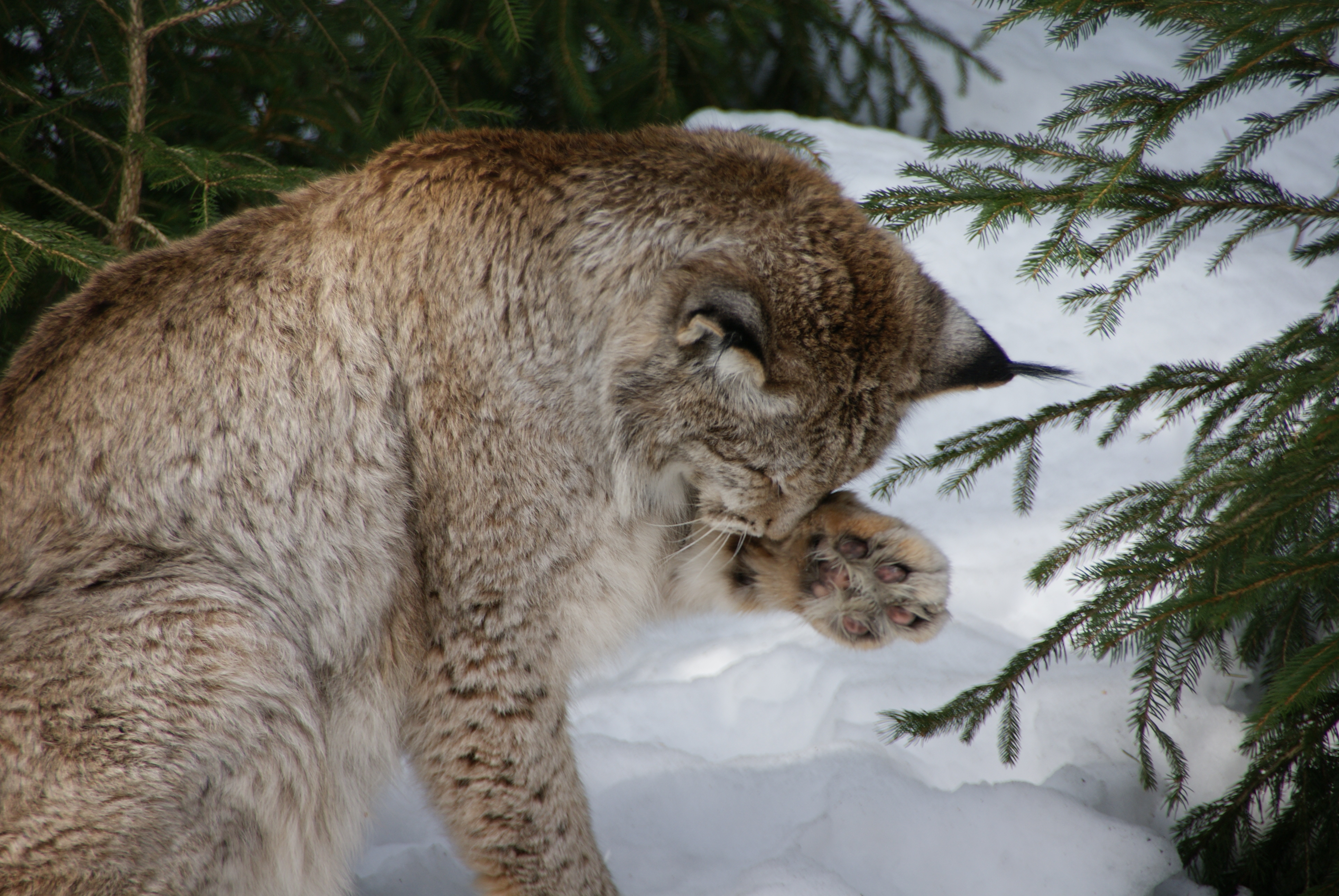
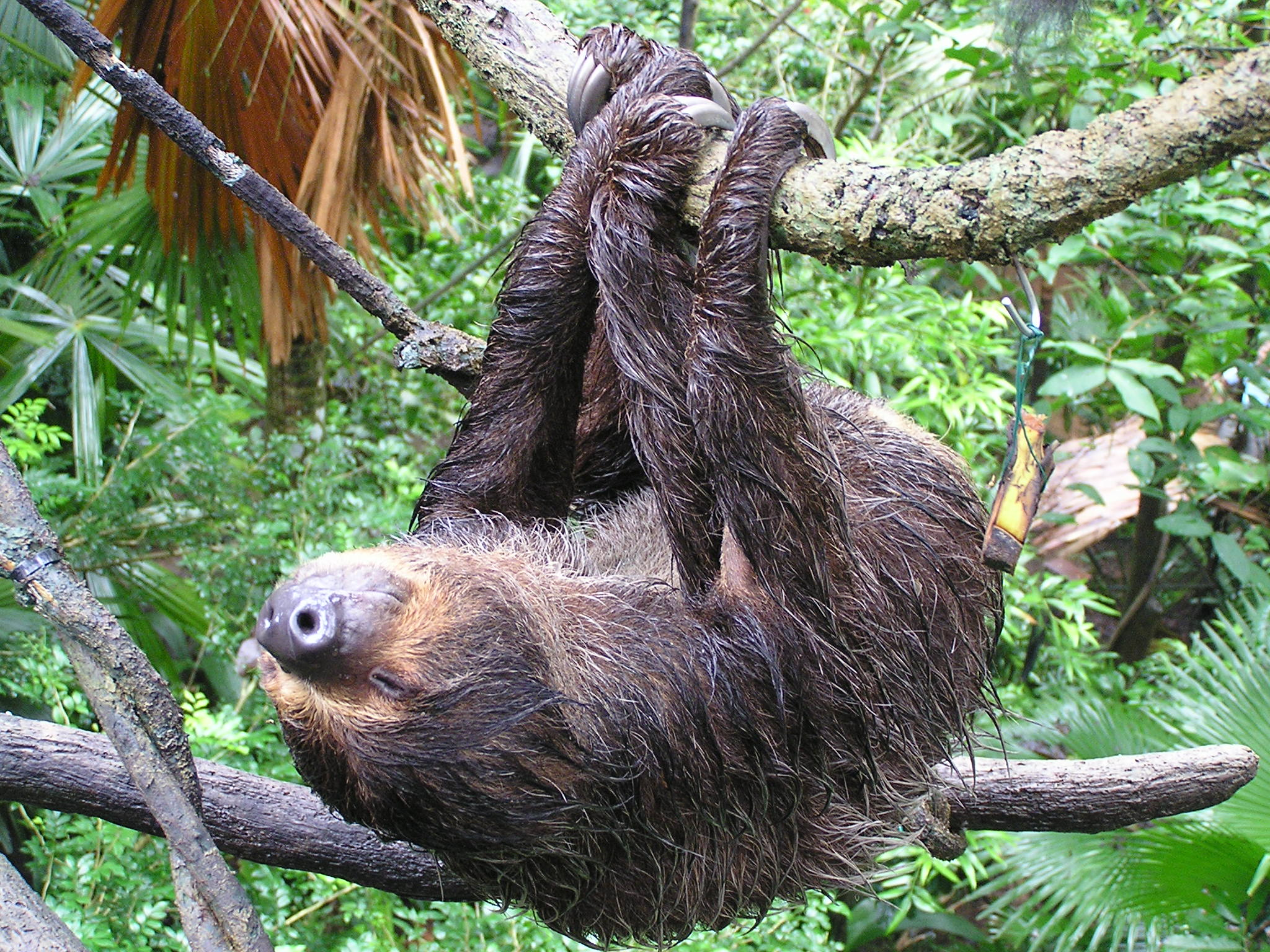
A grooming lynx and a two-toed sloth "at home"

In species in the order Carnivora, some of which are insectivores rather than carnivores, the cats are some of the most highly evolved predators designed for speed, power, and acceleration rather than stamina. Compared to ungulates, their limbs are shorter, more muscular in the distal segments, and maintain five metacarpals and digit bones; providing a greater range of movements, a more varied function and agility (e.g. climbing, swatting, and grooming). Some insectivorous species in this order have paws specialised for specific functions. The sloth bear uses their digits and large claws to tear logs open rather than kill prey. Other insectivorous species, such as the giant and red pandas, have developed large sesamoid bones in their paws that serve as an extra "thumb" while others, such as the meerkat, uses their limbs primary for digging and have vestigial first digits.

The arboreal two-toed sloth, a South American mammal in the order Pilosa, have limbs so highly adapted to hanging in branches that it is unable to walk on the ground where it has to drag its own body using the large curved claws on its foredigits.

== See also ==
- Human skeletal changes due to bipedalism
- Lower limb
