= Rhomboids =

Rhomboids can refer to:

- Rhomboid muscles
  - Rhomboid major muscle
  - Rhomboid minor muscle

== See also ==
- Rhomboid
