= Winged scapula =

Skeletal muscle condition around the shoulder blade

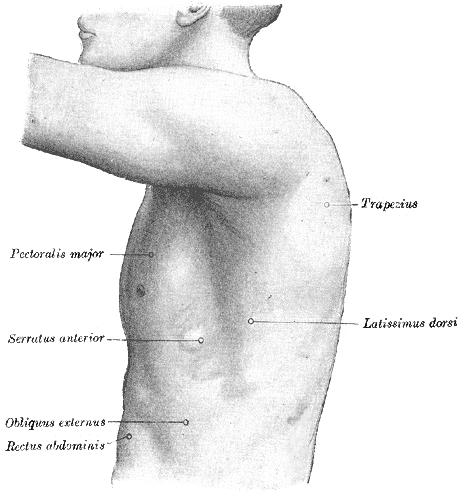
- The left side of the thorax. (Winging not illustrated but serratus anterior is labeled at left, and trapezius is labeled at upper right.)

A winged scapula (scapula alata) is a skeletal medical condition in which the shoulder blade protrudes from a person's back in an abnormal position.

In rare conditions, it has the potential to lead to limited functional activity in the upper extremity to which it is adjacent. It can affect a person's ability to lift, pull, and push weighty objects. In some serious cases, the ability to perform activities of daily living such as changing one's clothes and washing one's hair may be hindered.

The name of this condition comes from its appearance, a wing-like resemblance, due to the medial border of the scapula sticking straight out from the back. Scapular winging has been observed to disrupt scapulohumeral rhythm, contributing to decreased flexion and abduction of the upper extremity, as well as a loss in power and the source of considerable pain. A winged scapula is considered normal posture in young children, but not older children and adults.

== Signs and symptoms ==
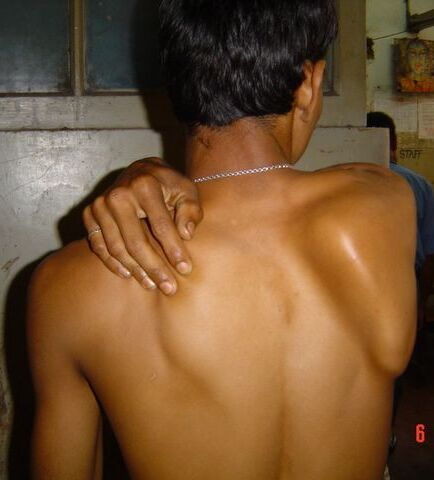
winging of the right scapula

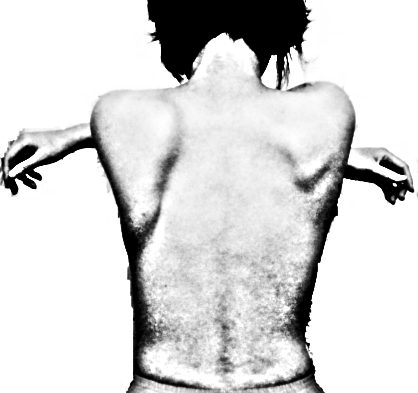
Winging of the left scapula

The severity and appearance of the winged scapula varies by individuals as well as the muscles and/or nerves that were affected. Pain is not seen in every case. In a study of 13 individuals with facioscapulohumeral muscular dystrophy (FSHD), none of the individuals complained of pain. Fatigue, however, was a common characteristic, and all had noted that there were limitations in their activities of daily life.

In most cases of winged scapula, damage to the serratus anterior muscle causes the deformation of the back. The serratus anterior muscle attaches to the medial anterior aspect of the scapula (i.e. it attaches on the side closest to the spine and runs along the side of the scapula that faces the ribcage) and normally anchors the scapula against the rib cage. When the serratus anterior contracts, upward rotation, abduction, and weak elevation of the scapula occur, allowing the arm to be raised above the head. The long thoracic nerve innervates the serratus anterior; therefore, damage to or impingement of this nerve can result in weakening or paralysis of the muscle. If this occurs, the scapula may slip away from the rib cage, giving it the wing-like appearance on the upper back. This characteristic may particularly be seen when the affected person pushes against resistance. The person may also have limited ability to lift their arm above their head.

In FSHD, the winged scapula is detected during contraction of the glenohumeral joint. In this movement, the glenohumeral joint atypically and concurrently abducts, and the scapula internally rotates.

== Causes ==
Winging of the scapula is divided into two categories, medial and lateral, according to the direction of winging.

Medial winging is more common, being caused by serratus anterior paralysis. This is typically due to damage (i.e. lesions) of the long thoracic nerve. This nerve supplies the serratus anterior, which is located on the side of the thorax and acts to pull the scapula forward. Serratus anterior palsy is a dysfunction that is characteristic of traumatic, non-traumatic, and idiopathic injury to the long thoracic nerve.

The second category is the lateral winging, which is caused by injury to the spinal accessory nerve. Severe atrophy of the trapezius is seen with accidental damage to the spinal accessory nerve during lymph node biopsy of the neck.

There are numerous ways in which the long thoracic nerve can sustain trauma-induced injury. These include, but are not limited to, blunt trauma (e.g. blow to the neck or shoulder, sudden depression of the shoulder girdle, unusual twisting of the neck and shoulder), repetitive movements (as observed in athletic activities such as weight lifting or sports that involve throwing), excessive compression of the shoulder area by straps (see backpack palsy), and various household activities (e.g., gardening, digging, car washing, prolonged abduction of the arms when sleeping, propping up the head to read, etc.). Sometimes, other structures in the body, such as inflamed and enlarged subcoracoid or subscapular bursa, press on the nerve. Clinical treatments may also cause injury to the long thoracic nerve (iatrogenesis from forceful manipulation, mastectomies with axillary node dissection, surgical treatment of spontaneous pneumothorax, post-general anesthesia for various clinical reasons, and electrical shock, amongst others).

Non-traumatic induced injury to the long thoracic nerve includes, but is not limited to, causes such as viral illness (e.g. influenza, tonsillitis-bronchitis, polio), allergic-drug reactions, drug overdose, toxic exposure (e.g. herbicides, tetanus), C7 radiculopathy, and coarctation of the aorta.

Secondary to serratus anterior palsy, a winged scapula is also caused by trapezius and rhomboid muscle palsy involving the accessory nerve and the dorsal scapular nerve, respectively.

Though the most common causes of a winged scapula are due to serratus anterior palsy, and less commonly trapezius and rhomboid palsy, there are still other circumstances that present the ailment. These incidences include direct injuries to the scapulothoracic muscles (i.e. trapezius and rhomboid muscles), and structural abnormalities (e.g. rotator cuff pathology, shoulder instability, etc.).

== Diagnosis ==
In addition to history and exam, it has been recommended to perform projectional radiography of the neck, chest, shoulder, and thoracic inlet to rule out structural abnormalities such as malunited or greenstick fractures. Computed tomography (CT) or magnetic resonance imaging (MRI) are rarely indicated, but may be useful to rule out certain diagnoses if suspected, such as neurofibromatosis-related injury, intervertebral disc disorder, radiculopathy, and tumors.

== Treatment ==
There are various classifications for winged scapula, and likewise, several treatment options. Strength training, particularly of the serratus anterior, may be recommended as this muscle is responsible for holding the medial scapula close to the rib cage. In more severe cases, physical therapy can help by strengthening related muscles. Physical therapy constitutes treatment options if there is weakness of the glenohumeral joint muscles, but if the muscles do not contract clinically and symptoms continue to be severe for more than 3–6 months, surgery may be the next choice.

Physical therapy for a winged scapula will usually incorporate exercises aimed at strengthening the serratus anterior. The push-up plus (PUP) exercise is one of the most commonly prescribed exercises for strengthening the serratus anterior. The push-up plus is usually done in either a push-up position either against a wall, or progressed to the floor. Full scapular protraction (the plus) is added after full elbow extension at the end of the usual push-up exercise. The plus phase during the PUP exercise has been shown to elicit the highest average serratus anterior electromyographic (EMG) activity when compared with other SA-activating and closed kinetic chain exercises.

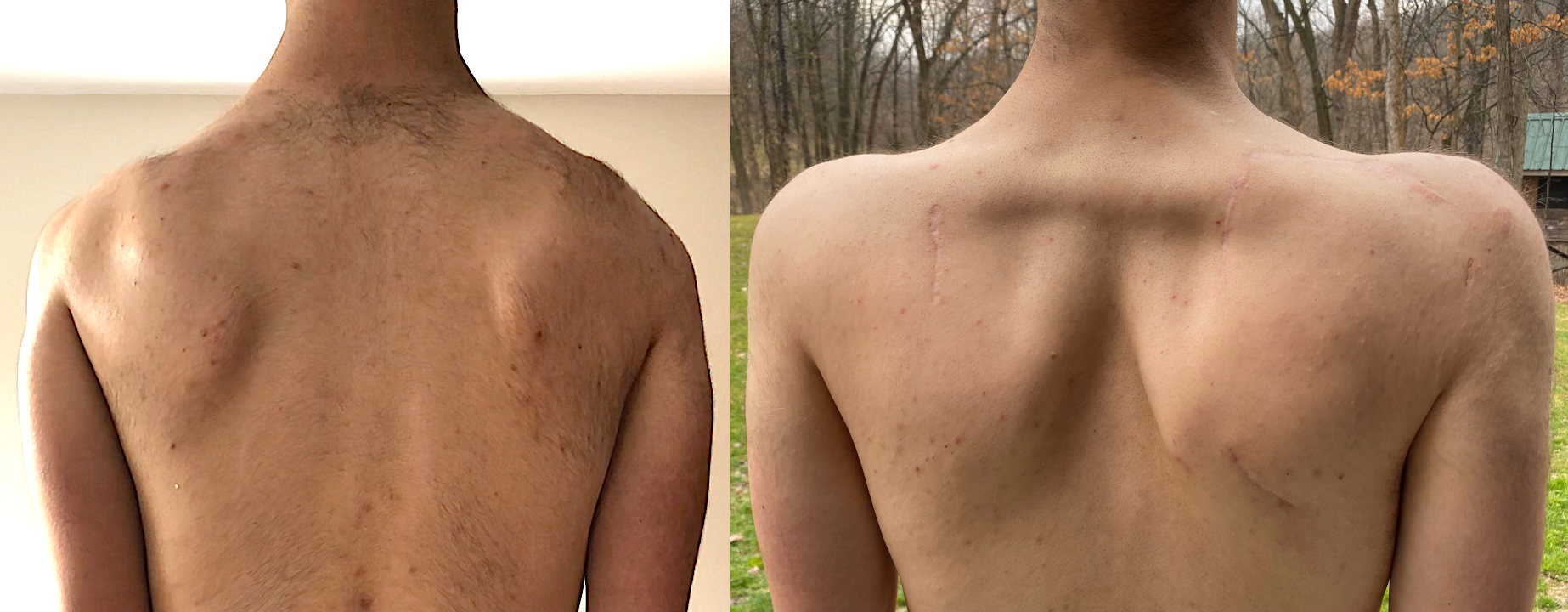
Scapula-to-scapula scapulopexy, pre- and post-operation in person with FSHD. The scapulas are tethered together into a retracted position with an Achilles tendon graft. In the right image, the rhomboid major muscles are distinguishable.

Surgical options include neurolysis (chordotomy) and intercostal nerve transfer if a nerve lesion is the cause of winging. For scapular winging not amenable to nerve repair, tendon transfer is an option. Pectoralis major transfer can be done for isolated serratus anterior palsy, and an Eden-Lange procedure can be done for isolated trapezius palsy. When tendon transfer is not feasible, such as in the case of muscular dystrophy or multiple muscular deficits, remaining options include scapulothoracic fusion (also known as scapulodesis), which induces bony fusion between the scapula and the rib cage, and scapulothoracic fixation without arthrodesis (scapulopexy). Even though scapulothoracic fusion has been shown to have successful outcomes, complications were present in over 40% of the 130 patients observed by Kord et al.

== Epidemiology ==
A winged scapula due to serratus anterior palsy is rare. In one report (Fardin et al.), there was an incidence of 15 cases out of 7,000 patients seen in the electromyographical laboratory. In another report (Overpeck and Ghormley), there was only one case out of 38,500 patients observed at the Mayo Clinic. In yet another report (Remak), there were three diagnoses of serratus anterior paralysis throughout a series of 12,000 neurological examinations.
