= Serratus punch =

Shoulder exercise

Video of a woman performing the serratus punch

The serratus punch is an exercise that works scapular protraction using the serratus anterior muscle and to a lesser extent the pectoralis minor. The exercise even performed at maximum voluntary isometric contraction did not increase pain in one study in people with shoulder pain. Because strengthening the serratus anterior improves shoulder stability, the exercise is recommended for people suffering from shoulder pain or bad posture and is recommended in one treatment protocol as non-surgical treatment for a rotator cuff tear.
