= Cervicoaxillary canal =

Passageway through the neck and shoulder for the long thoracic nerve

The cervicoaxillary canal is the passageway that extends between the neck and the upper extremities through which the long thoracic nerve and other structures pass.

Its structure is defined by being posteriorly bordered by the scapula, anteriorly by the clavicle, and medially by the first rib. The long thoracic nerve traverses this passageway in addition to axillary blood vessels and the brachial plexus. This complex nerve network arises in the neck from the fifth, sixth, seventh and eighth cervical roots, C5, C6, C7 and C8, together with the first thoracic root, T1. It then enters the canal in the axilla.
