= Long thoracic nerve =

Large nerve

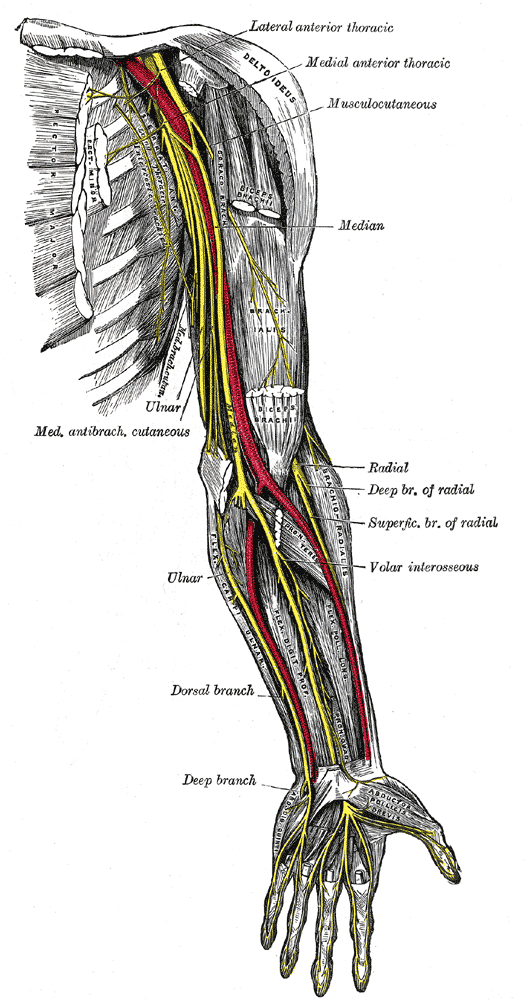
- Nerves of the left upper extremity. (Long thoracic labeled vertically at shoulder, to left of artery.)

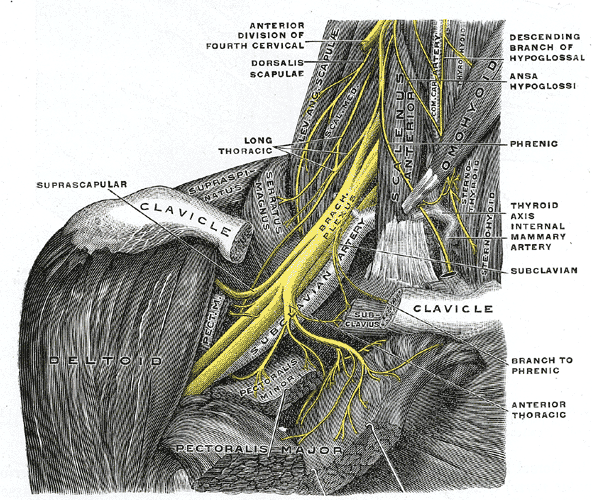
- The right brachial plexus with its short branches, viewed from in front. (Long thoracic labeled at center, third from top.)

Details
- From: Brachial plexus (C5-C7)
- Innervates: Serratus anterior muscle

Identifiers
- Latin: nervus thoracicus longus
- TA98: A14.2.03.012
- TA2: 6410
- FMA: 65275

The long thoracic nerve (also: external respiratory nerve of Bell or posterior thoracic nerve) is a branch of the brachial plexus derived from cervical nerves C5-C7 that innervates the serratus anterior muscle.

== Structure ==
=== Origin ===
The long thoracic nerve arises from the anterior rami of cervical spinal nerves C5, C6, and C7. The root from C7 may occasionally be absent. The roots from C5 and C6 pierce through the scalenus medius, while the C7 root passes in front of the muscle.

=== Course and relations ===
The long thoracic nerve descends through the cervicoaxillary canal. It is posterior to the brachial plexus, and the axillary artery and vein. This takes it deep to the clavicle. It rests on the outer surface of the serratus anterior muscle. It extends along the side of the thorax to the lower border of the serratus anterior muscle, supplying fibres to each of the muscle's digitations.

== Function ==
The long thoracic nerve innervates the serratus anterior muscle. It supplies filaments to each of its digitations (finger-like projections).

== Clinical significance ==
Due to its long, relatively superficial course, the long thoracic nerve is susceptible to injury, either through direct trauma or stretch. Mechanisms of injury include:

- nerve lesions.
- various sports injuries, typically occurring from a blow to the ribs underneath an outstretched arm.
- surgery for shoulder and thorax. Treating breast cancer with removal of axillary lymph nodes.
- carrying weight, such as heavy bags, over the shoulder for a prolonged time.
- Parsonage Turner Syndrome, an autoimmune disease.
- trauma or infection.

Symptoms are often minimal – if symptomatic, a posterior shoulder or scapular burning type of pain may be reported. Some injuries, particularly lesions, can paralyse the serratus anterior muscle to produce a winged scapula. This is most prominent when the arm is lifted forward or when the patient pushes the outstretched arm against a wall. However, even winging may not be evident until the trapezius stretches enough to reveal an injury several weeks later.

== See also ==
- Backpack palsy

== Additional images ==
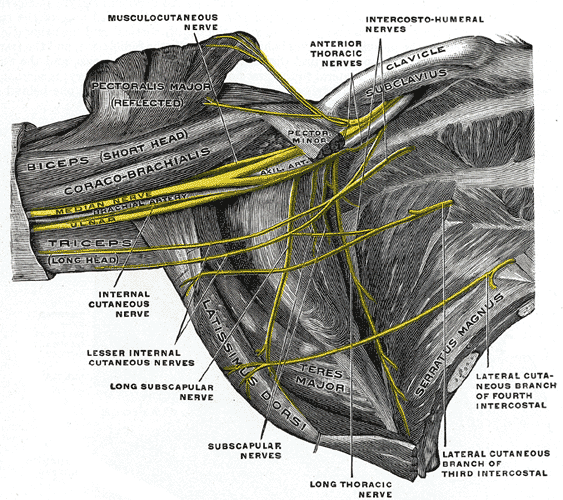
The right brachial plexus (infraclavicular portion) in the axillary fossa; viewed from below and in front.

Brachial plexus

Brachial plexus with courses of spinal nerves shown
