= Levator scapulae muscle =

Slender skeletal muscle at the back and side of the neck

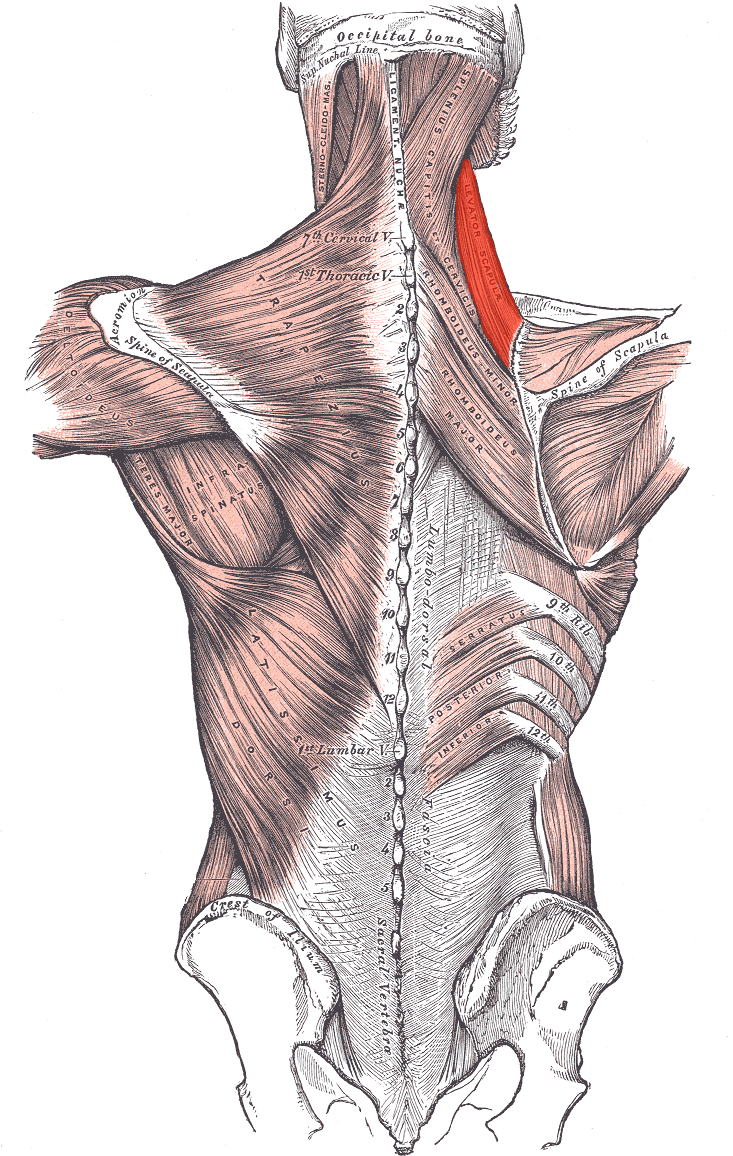
- Muscles connecting the upper extremity to the vertebral column. (Levator scapulae visible at upper right, at the neck.)

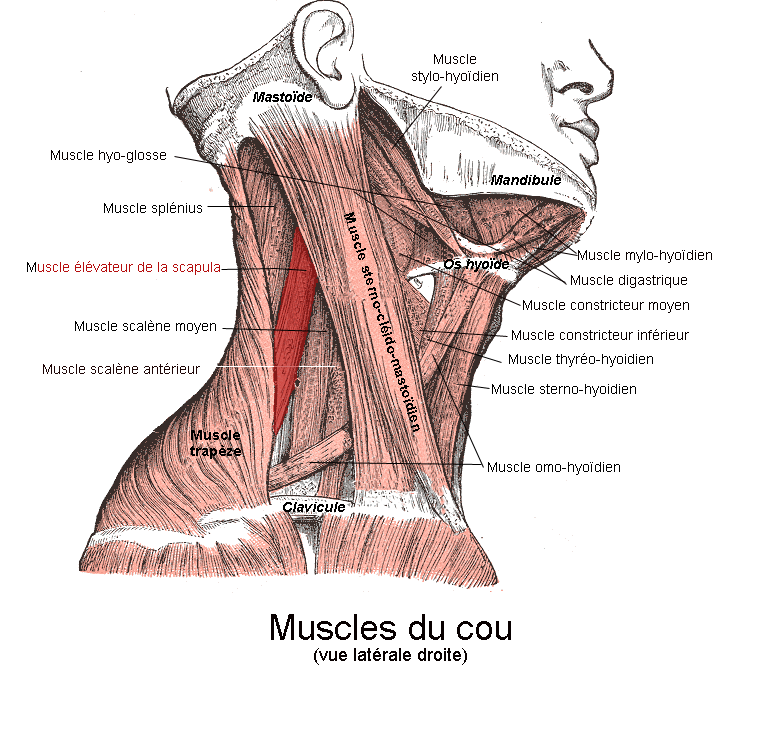
- Muscles of neck. (Levator scapulae visible at center left.)

Details
- Pronunciation: /lɪˈveɪtər ˈskæpjʊli/
- Origin: Posterior tubercles of transverse processes of C1 - C4 vertebrae
- Insertion: Superior part of medial border of scapula
- Artery: Dorsal scapular artery
- Nerve: Cervical nerve (C3, C4) and dorsal scapular nerve (C5)
- Actions: Elevates scapula and tilts its glenoid cavity inferiorly by downwardly rotating the scapula

Identifiers
- Latin: musculus levator scapulae
- TA98: A04.3.01.009
- TA2: 2234
- FMA: 32519

The levator scapulae is a slender skeletal muscle situated at the back and side of the neck. It originates from the transverse processes of the four uppermost cervical vertebrae; it inserts onto the upper portion of the medial border of the scapula. It is innervated by the cervical nerves C3-C4, and frequently also by the dorsal scapular nerve. As the Latin name suggests, its main function is to lift the scapula.

== Anatomy ==
=== Attachments ===
The muscle descends diagonally from its origin to its insertion.

==== Origin ====
The levator scapulae originates from the posterior tubercles of the transverse processes of cervical vertebrae C1-4. At its origin, it attaches via tendinous slips.

==== Insertion ====
It inserts onto the medial border of the scapula (with its site of insertion extending between the superior angle of the scapula superiorly, and the junction of spine of scapula and medial border of scapula inferiorly).

=== Relations ===
One of the muscles within the floor of the posterior triangle of the neck, the superior part of levator scapulae is covered by sternocleidomastoid and its inferior part by the trapezius.

It is bounded in front by the scalenus medius and behind by splenius cervicis.

The spinal accessory nerve crosses laterally in the middle part of the muscle and the dorsal scapular nerve may lie deep to or pass through it.

The levator scapulae may lie deep to the sternocleidomastoid at its origin, deep or adjacent to the splenius capitis at its origin and mid-portion, and deep to the trapezius in its lower portion.

=== Variation ===
The number of attachments varies; a slip may extend to the occipital or mastoid, to the trapezius, scalene or serratus anterior, or to the first or second rib. The muscle may be subdivided into several distinct parts from origin to insertion. Levator claviculæ from the transverse processes of one or two upper cervical vertebræ to the outer end of the clavicle corresponds to a muscle of lower animals. More or less union with the serratus anterior muscle.

=== Innervation ===
The levator scapulae is innervated by 2–3 branches of the 3rd and 4th cervical nerves, and frequently by a branch from the dorsal scapular nerve.

=== Blood supply ===
The levator scapulae is supplied by the dorsal scapular artery. Normally, this artery has a small branch which passes laterally to the supraspinatus fossa of the scapula, and in a third of cases, this branch supplies the muscle. If the dorsal scapular artery comes off the transverse cervical artery, the parent transverse cervical artery splits the dorsal scapular artery passes medially, while the transverse cervical artery passes laterally.

== Function ==
When the spine is fixed, levator scapulae elevates the scapula and rotates its inferior angle medially. It often works in combination with other muscles like the rhomboids and pectoralis minor to produce downward rotation of the scapula.

Elevating or rotating one shoulder at a time would require muscles to stabilize the cervical spine and keep it immobile so it does not flex or rotate. Elevating both at once with equal amounts of pull on both side of cervical spinal origins would counteract these forces. Downward rotation would be prevented by co-contraction of other muscles that elevate the spine, the upper fibers of the trapezius, which is an upward rotator.

When the shoulder is fixed, levator scapulae rotates to the same side and flexes the cervical spine laterally. When both shoulders are fixed, a simultaneous co-contraction of both levator scapulae muscles in equal amounts would not produce lateral flexion or rotation, and may produce straight flexion or extension of the cervical spine.

== Non-human animals ==
The muscles of the shoulder can be categorized into three topographic units: the scapulohumeral, axiohumeral, and axioscapular groups. Levator scapulae forms part of the latter group together with rhomboid major, rhomboid minor, serratus anterior, and trapezius. The trapezius evolved separately, but the other three muscles in this group evolved from the first eight or ten ribs and the transverse processes of the cervical vertebrae (homologous to the ribs). The serratus anterior formed the basal unit for these three muscles. In higher primates it has evolved into two separate muscles—serratus anterior and levator scapulae—by concentration of the proximal and distal fibers and progressive reduction of the intermediate fibers. The fibers concerned with the cranial displacement of the scapula became the levator scapulae.

== Additional images ==
Position of levator scapulae muscle

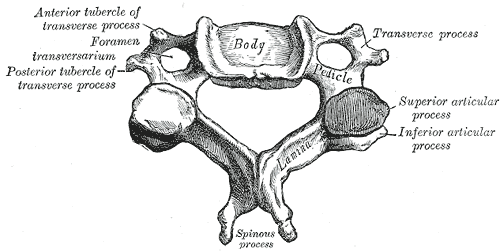
A cervical vertebra

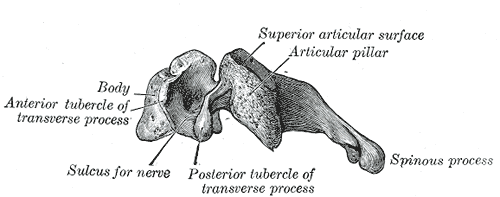
Side view of a typical cervical vertebra

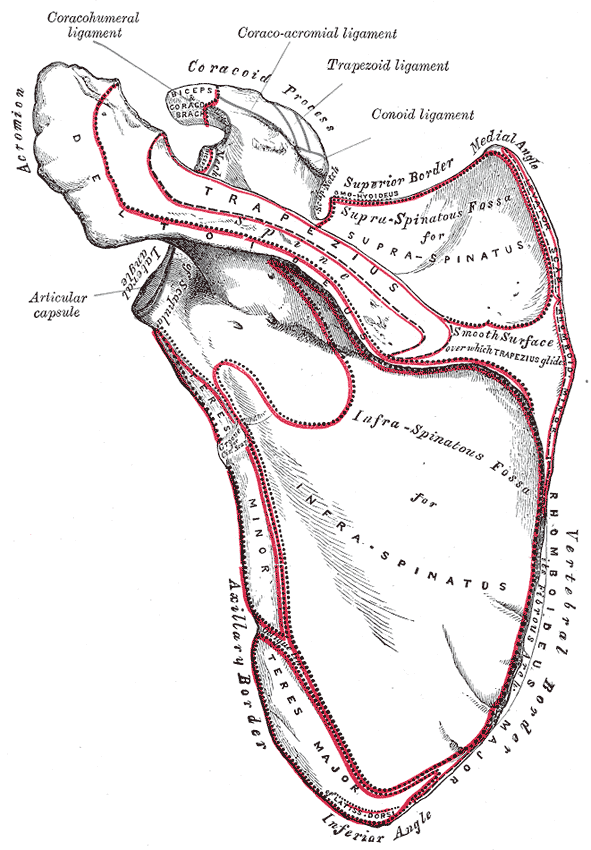
Left scapula. Dorsal surface.

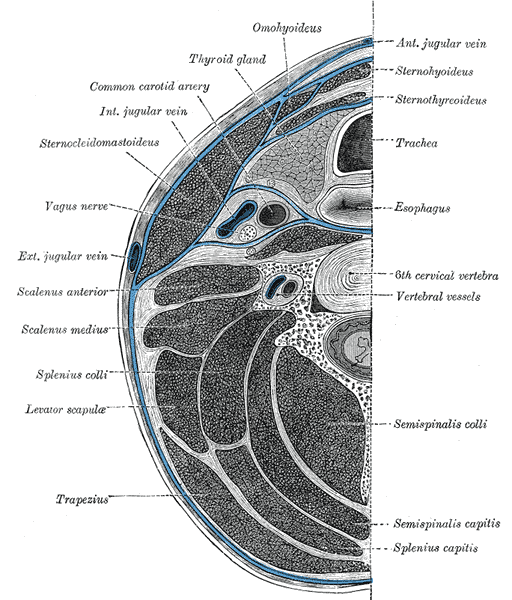
Section of the neck at about the level of the sixth cervical vertebra

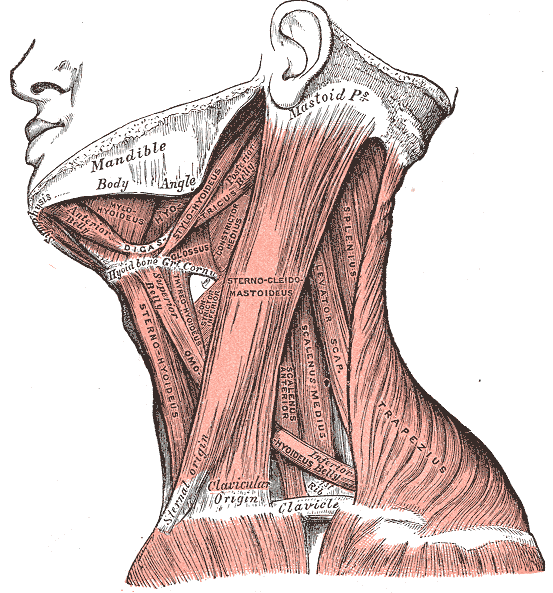
Muscles of the neck. Lateral view.

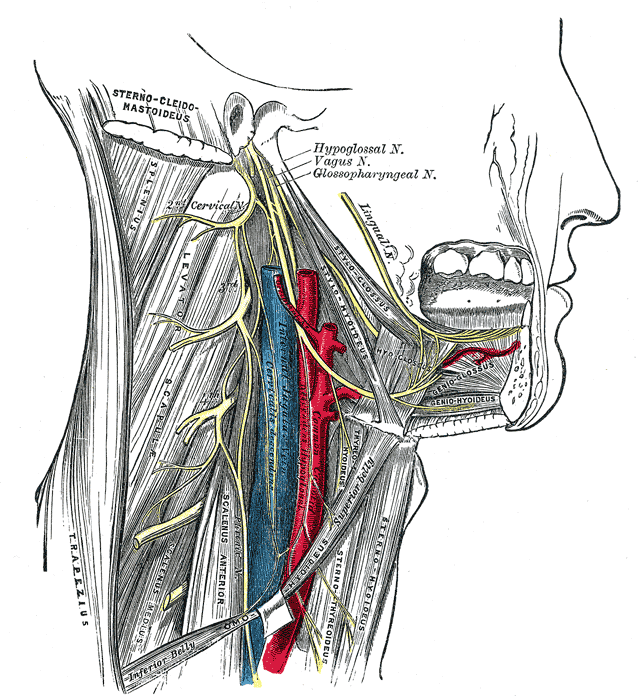
Hypoglossal nerve, cervical plexus, and their branches

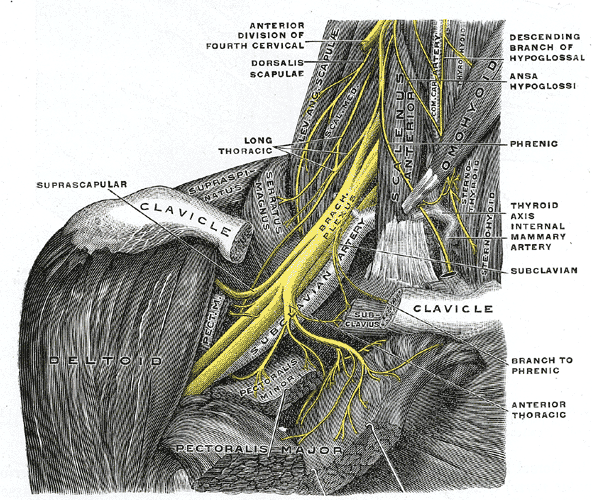
The right brachial plexus with its short branches, viewed from in front

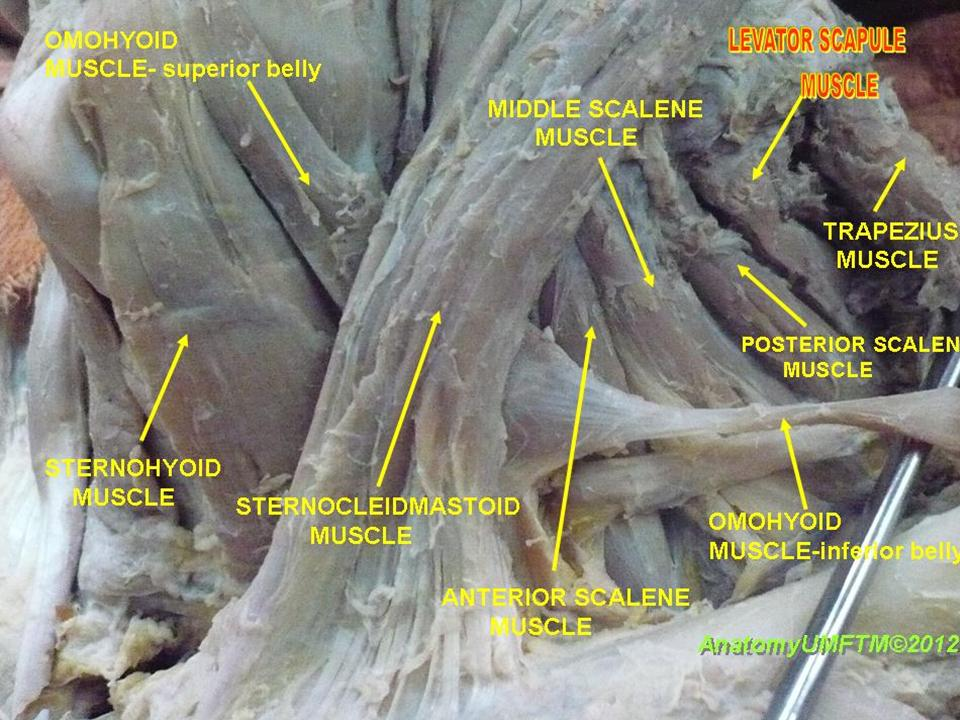
Levator scapulae muscle

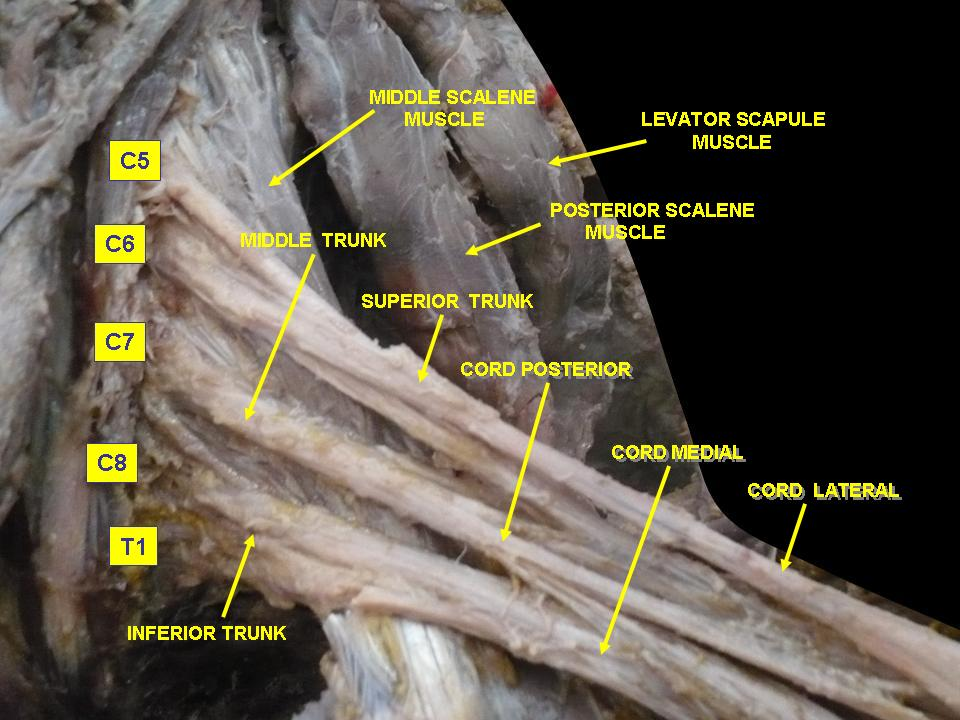
Brachial plexus. Deep dissection.

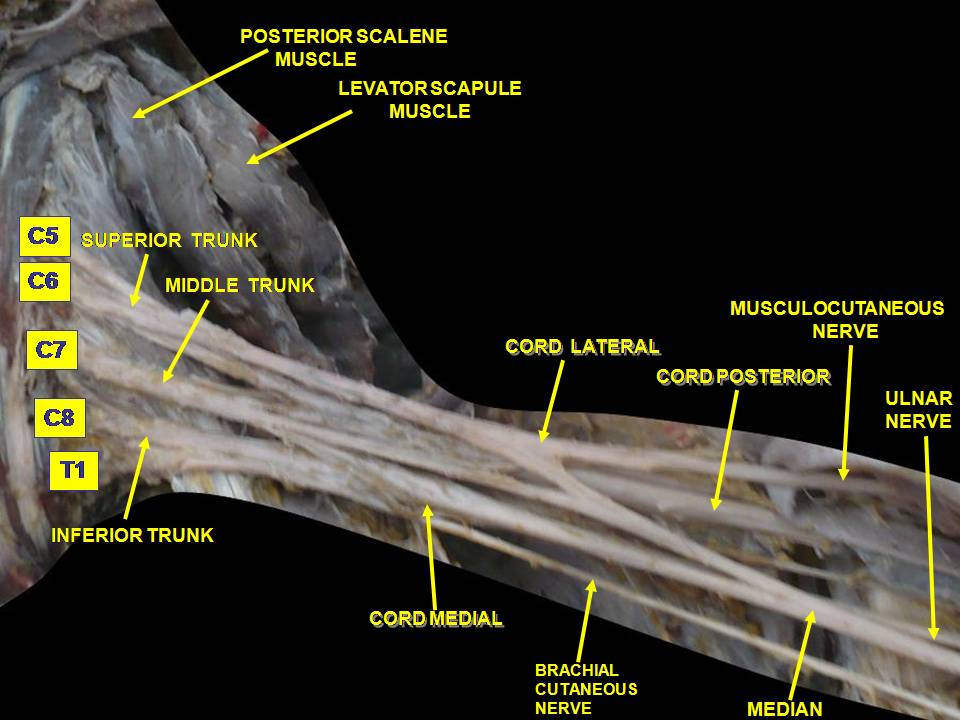
Brachial plexus. Deep dissection. Anterolateral view

== See also ==
- Levator claviculae muscle
- Stiff neck – commonly caused by pain in the levator scapulae

== Sources ==
- Brand, R. A. (2008). "Origin and Comparative Anatomy of the Pectoral Limb". Clinical Orthopaedics and Related Research. 466 (3): 531–42. doi:10.1007/s11999-007-0102-6. PMC 2505211. PMID 18264841.
- Platzer, Werner (2004). Color Atlas of Human Anatomy, Vol. 1: Locomotor System (5th ed.). Thieme. ISBN 3-13-533305-1.
- Rockwood, Charles A.; Matsen, Frederick A.; Lippitt, Steven B.; Wirth, Michael A. (2009). The shoulder, Volume 1. Elsevier. ISBN 978-1-4160-3427-8.
