= Rhomboid major muscle =

Skeletal muscle in the human back

Rhomboid major
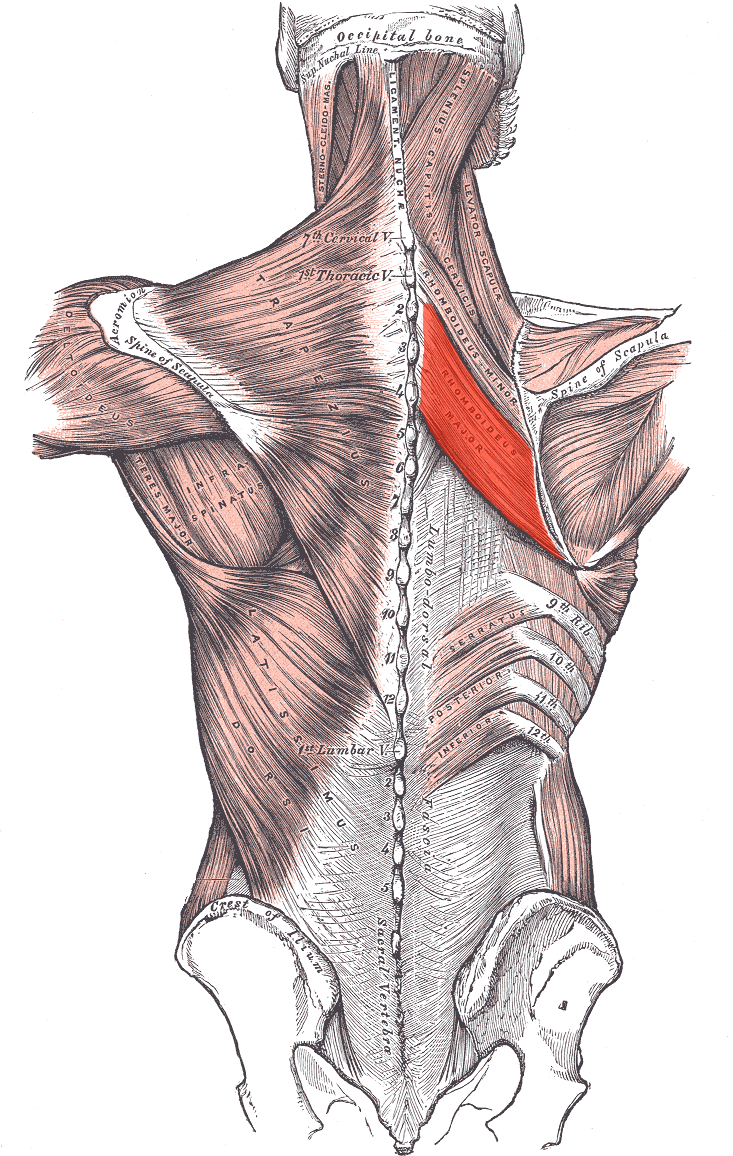
- Muscles connecting the upper extremity to the vertebral column. Rhomboid major indicated in red.

Details
- Origin: Spinous processes of the T2 to T5 vertebrae
- Insertion: Medial border of the scapula, inferior to the insertion of rhomboid minor muscle
- Artery: Dorsal scapular artery
- Nerve: Dorsal scapular nerve (C5)
- Actions: Retracts the scapula and rotates it to depress the glenoid cavity. It also fixes the scapula to the thoracic wall.
- Antagonist: Serratus anterior muscle

Identifiers
- Latin: musculus rhomboideus major
- TA98: A04.3.01.007
- TA2: 2232
- FMA: 13379

The rhomboid major is a skeletal muscle of the back that connects the scapula with the vertebrae of the spinal column. It originates from the spinous processes of the thoracic vertebrae T2–T5 and supraspinous ligament; it inserts onto the lower portion of the medial border of the scapula. It acts together with the rhomboid minor to keep the scapula pressed against thoracic wall and to retract the scapula toward the vertebral column.

As the word rhomboid suggests, the rhomboid major is diamond-shaped. The major in its name indicates that it is the larger of the two rhomboids.

== Structure ==
=== Origin ===
The rhomboid major arises from the spinous processes of the thoracic vertebrae T2–T5 as well as the supraspinous ligament.

=== Insertion ===
It inserts on the medial border of the scapula, from about the level of the scapular spine to the scapula's inferior angle.

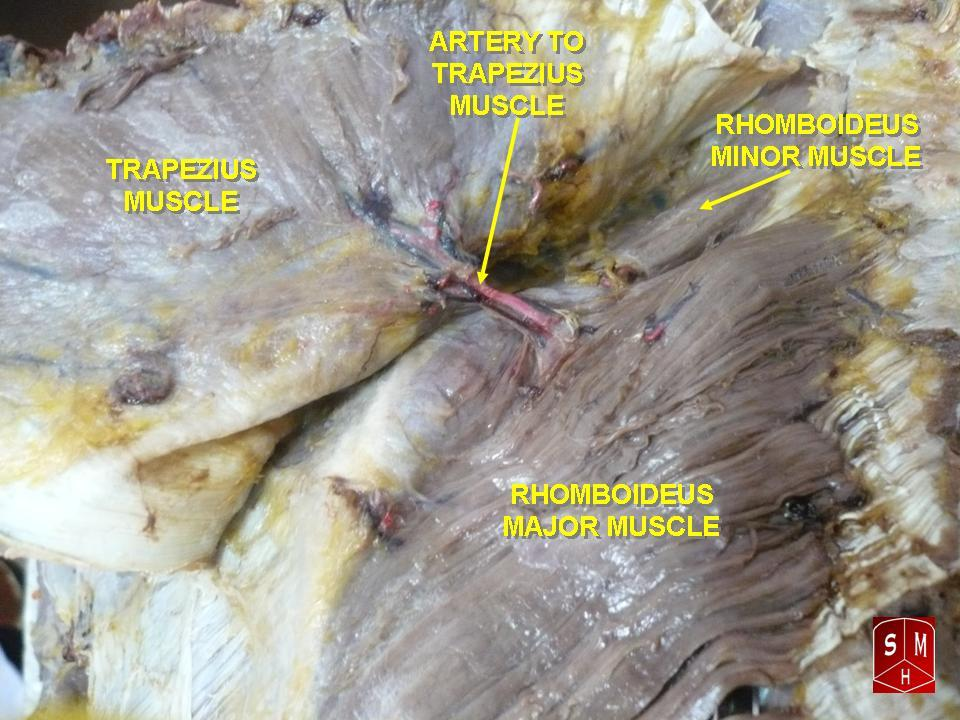
Rhomboideus major muscle

=== Innervation ===
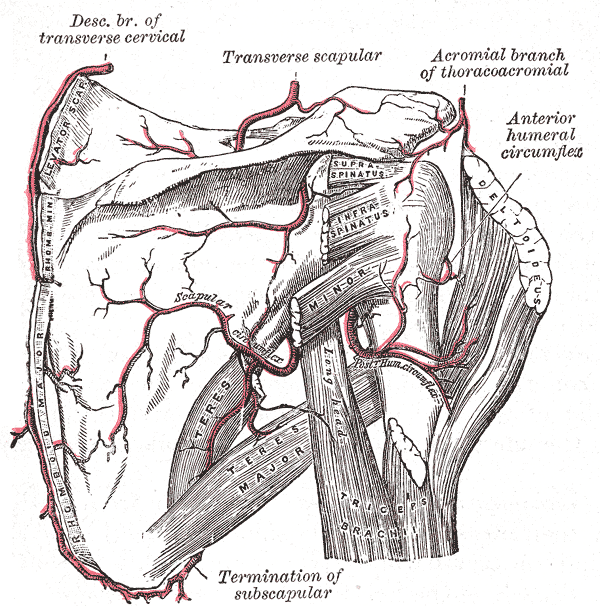
The scapular and circumflex arteries. Rhomboid major labelled at lower left.

The rhomboid major, like the rhomboid minor, is innervated by the ventral primary ramus via the dorsal scapular nerve (C5).

=== Blood supply ===
Both rhomboid muscles also derive their arterial blood supply from the dorsal scapular artery.

=== Relations ===
The rhomboid major is considered a superficial back muscle. It is deep to the trapezius, and situated directly inferior to the rhomboid minor.

=== Variation ===
The two rhomboids are sometimes fused into a single muscle.

== Function ==
The rhomboid major helps to hold the scapula (and thus the upper limb) onto the ribcage. Other muscles that perform this function include the serratus anterior and pectoralis minor.

Both rhomboids (major and minor) also act to retract the scapula, pulling it towards the vertebral column.

The rhomboids work collectively with the levator scapulae muscles to elevate the medial border of the scapula, downwardly rotating the scapula with respect to the glenohumeral joint. Antagonists to this function (upward rotators of the scapulae) are the serratus anterior and lower fibers of the trapezius. If the lower fibers are inactive, the serratus anterior and upper trapezius work in tandem with rhomboids and levators to elevate the entire scapula.

== Clinical significance ==
If the rhomboid major is torn, wasted, or unable to contract, scapular instability may result. The implications of scapular instability caused by the rhomboid major include scapular winging during scapular protraction, excessive lateral rotation and depression of the scapula, as the antagonistic action by the rhomboid major is absent. With scapular instability, movement in the upper extremity is limited as the scapula cannot guide the desired movement of the arm and shoulders. Pain, discomfort, and limited range of motion of the shoulder are possible implications of scapular instability.

Treatment for scapular instability may include surgery followed by physical therapy or occupational therapy. Physical therapy may consist of stretching and endurance exercises of the shoulder. Pilates and yoga have been also suggested as potential treatment and prevention of scapular instability.

== Other animals ==
The muscles of the shoulder can be categorized into three topographic units: the scapulohumeral, axiohumeral, and axioscapular groups. Stretching from the spine to the scapula, rhomboid major forms part of the latter group together with rhomboid minor, serratus anterior, levator scapulae, and trapezius. The trapezius has evolved separately, but the other muscles in this group evolved from the first eight or ten ribs and the transverse processes of the cervical vertebrae (homologous to the ribs). Functional demands have resulted in the evolution of individual muscles from the basal unit formed by the serratus anterior.

In early life forms, the main function of the axioscapular group is to control the movements of the vertebral border of the scapula: fibers concerned with the dorsal movement of scapula evolved into the rhomboids, those with ventral motion into serratus anterior, and those with cranial movements into levator scapulae.

== Additional images ==
Position of rhomboid major muscle (shown in red).

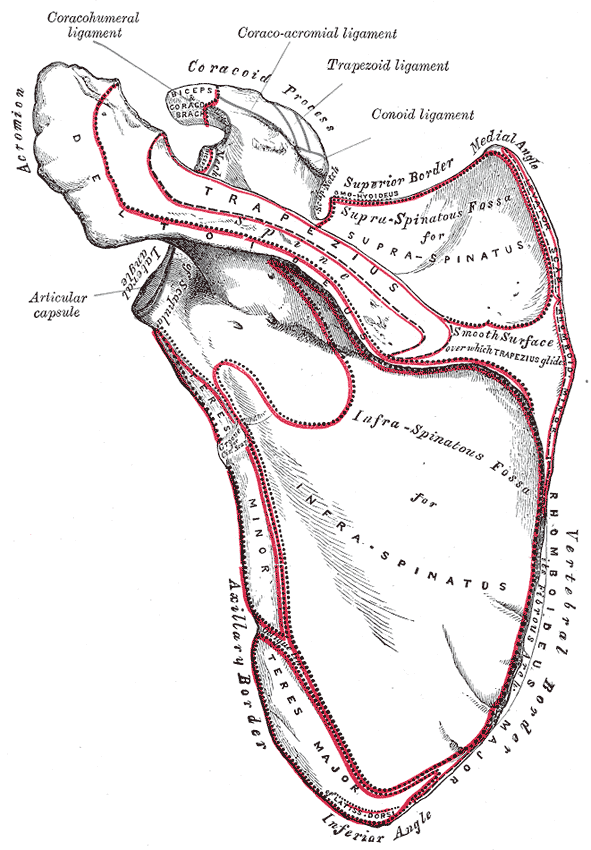
Left scapula. Dorsal surface.

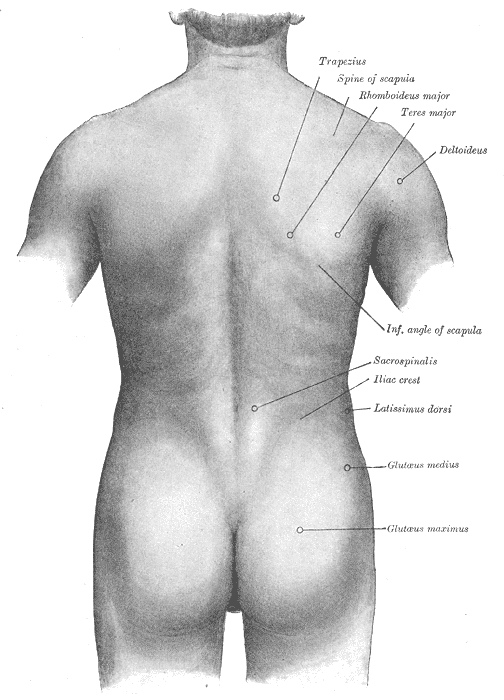
Surface anatomy of the back.

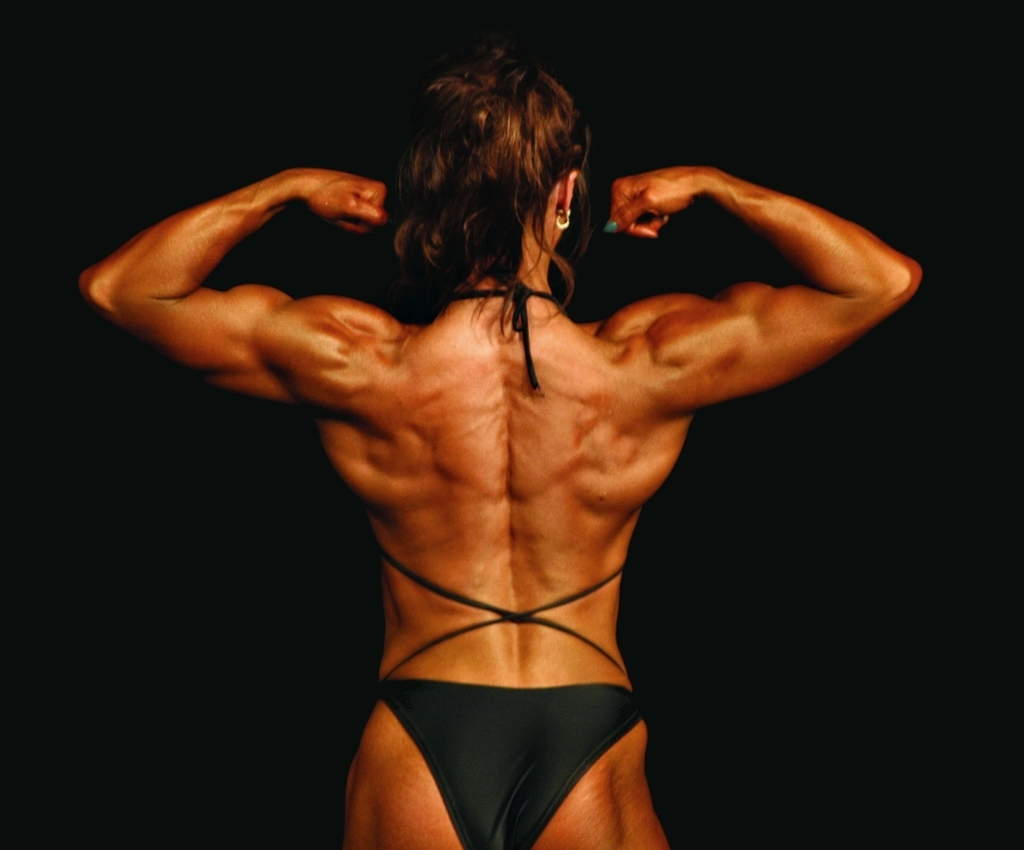
Full back muscle flex.

== See also ==
Triangle of auscultation
