= Serratus anterior muscle =

Muscle on the surface of the ribs

Serratus anterior
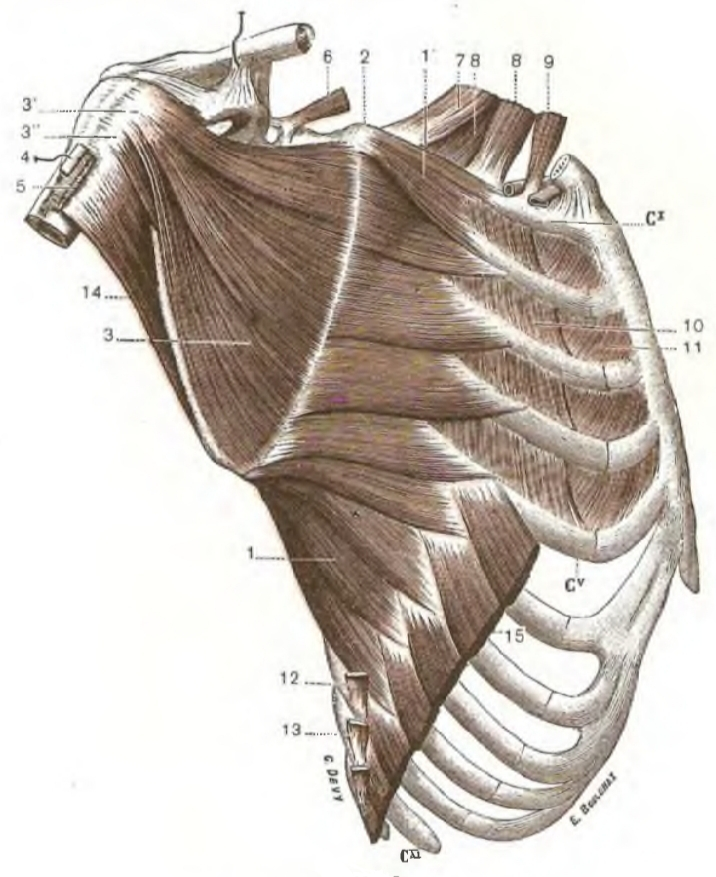
- Right-sided serratus anterior (labeled 1 and 1') and other muscles; lateral view. (After Testut's Anatomy.)

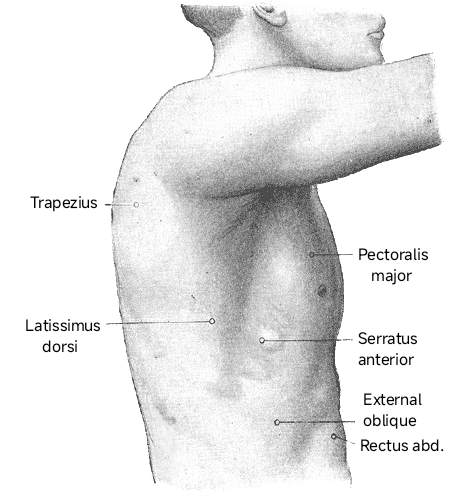
- The right side of the thorax

Details
- Pronunciation: /ˌsɪˈreɪtəs ænˈtɪəriər/
- Origin: Fleshy slips from the outer surface of upper from 1st to 9 ribs
- Insertion: Costal aspect of medial margin of the scapula
- Artery: Lateral thoracic artery, superior thoracic artery (upper part), thoracodorsal artery (lower part)
- Nerve: Long thoracic nerve (from roots of brachial plexus C5-C7)
- Actions: Protracts and stabilizes scapula, assists in upward rotation, assists in inspiration (when shoulder girdle is fixed)
- Antagonist: Rhomboid major, rhomboid minor, trapezius

Identifiers
- Latin: musculus serratus anterior, serratus lateralis
- TA98: A04.4.01.008
- TA2: 2307
- FMA: 13397

The serratus anterior, also known as serratus magnus, is a muscle of the chest. It originates at the side of the chest from the upper 9 ribs; it inserts along the entire length of the anterior aspect of the medial border of the scapula. It is innervated by the long thoracic nerve from the brachial plexus. The serratus anterior acts to pull the scapula forward around the thorax.

The muscle is named from Latin: serrare = to saw (referring to the shape); and anterior = on the front side of the body.

== Structure ==
=== Origin ===
Serratus anterior typically originates by ten muscle slips – arising from the 1st to 9th ribs; because two slips arise from the 2nd rib, the number of slips is greater than the number of ribs from which they originate.

=== Insertion ===
The muscle is inserted along the medial border of the scapula between the superior and inferior angle of the scapula.

The muscle is divided into three parts according to the points of insertion:

- the serratus anterior superior is inserted near the superior angle;
- the serratus anterior intermediate is inserted along the medial border;
- the serratus anterior inferior is inserted near the inferior angle.

=== Innervation ===
The serratus anterior is innervated by the long thoracic nerve, a branch of the brachial plexus. The long thoracic nerve travels inferiorly on the surface of the serratus anterior muscle.

=== Relations ===
The serratus anterior lies deep to the subscapularis, from which it is separated by the subscapularis (supraserratus) bursa. It is separated from the rib by the scapulothoracic (infraserratus) bursa.

== Function ==
All three parts described above pull the scapula forward around the thorax, which is essential for anteversion of the arm. As such, the muscle is an antagonist to the rhomboids. However, when the inferior and superior parts act together, they keep the scapula pressed against the thorax together with the rhomboids and therefore these parts also act as synergists to the rhomboids. The inferior part can pull the lower end of the scapula laterally and forward and thus rotates the scapula to make elevation of the arm possible. Additionally, all three parts can lift the ribs when the shoulder girdle is fixed, and thus assist in respiration.

The serratus anterior is occasionally called the "big swing muscle" or "boxer's muscle" because it is largely responsible for the protraction of the scapula—that is, the pulling of the scapula forward and around the rib cage that occurs when someone throws a punch.

The serratus anterior acts in concert with the upper and lower fibers of the trapezius muscle to sustain upward rotation of the scapula, which allows for overhead lifting.

== Clinical significance ==
The long thoracic nerve that supplies the serratus anterior muscle is vulnerable during certain types of surgery (for example, during lymph node clearance from the axilla for breast cancer). Damage to this nerve is the most common cause of winged scapula.

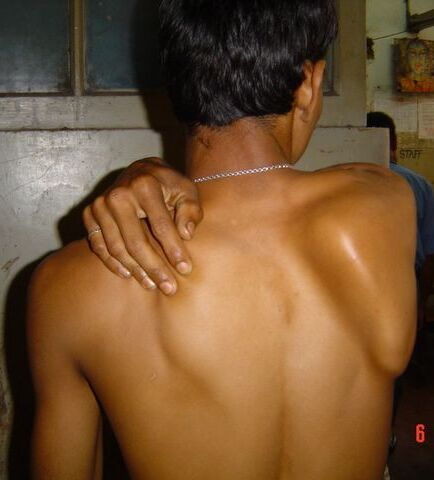
Right-sided winged scapula

== Other animals ==
The muscles of the shoulder can be categorized into three topographic units: the scapulohumeral, axiohumeral, and axioscapular groups. Serratus anterior forms part of the latter group together with rhomboid major, rhomboid minor, levator scapulae, and trapezius. The trapezius evolved separately, but the other three muscles in this group evolved from the first eight or ten ribs and the transverse processes of the cervical vertebrae (homologous to the ribs).

Functional demands have resulted in the evolution of individual muscles from the basal unit formed by the serratus anterior. In primitive tetrapods, the main function of the axioscapular group is to control the movements of the vertebral border of the scapula: fibers concerned with the dorsal movement of scapula evolved into the rhomboids, those with ventral motion into serratus anterior, and those with cranial movements into levator scapulae. The evolution of the serratus anterior itself has resulted in (1) grouping of its distal and proximal fibers, (2) size reduction of its intermediate fibers, and (3) the insertion of its dominant superior and inferior parts onto the superior and inferior angles of the scapula.

In primates, the thoracic cage is wide and the scapula is rotated onto its posterior side to have the glenoid cavity face laterally. Additionally, the clavicle takes care of medial forces. In cursorial mammals (for example the horse and other quadrupeds), the scapula is hanging vertically on the side of the thorax and the clavicle is absent. Therefore, in climbing animals, the serratus anterior supports the scapula against the reaction forces of the free limb and exerts high bending forces on the ribs. To sustain these forces, the ribs have a pronounced curvature and are supported by the clavicle. In cursorial animals, the thorax is hanging between the scapulae at the serratus anterior and pectoralis muscles.

== Additional images ==
Position of serratus anterior muscle. Scapulae are shown as semi-transparent.

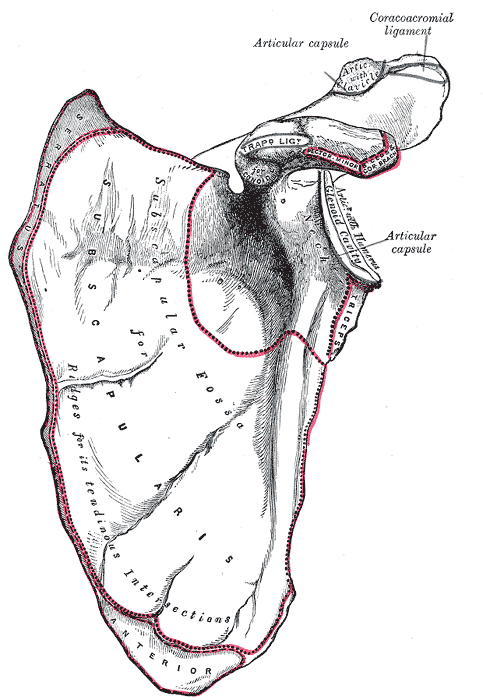
Left scapula, costal surface. Attachment point for the SA is seen on the left border.

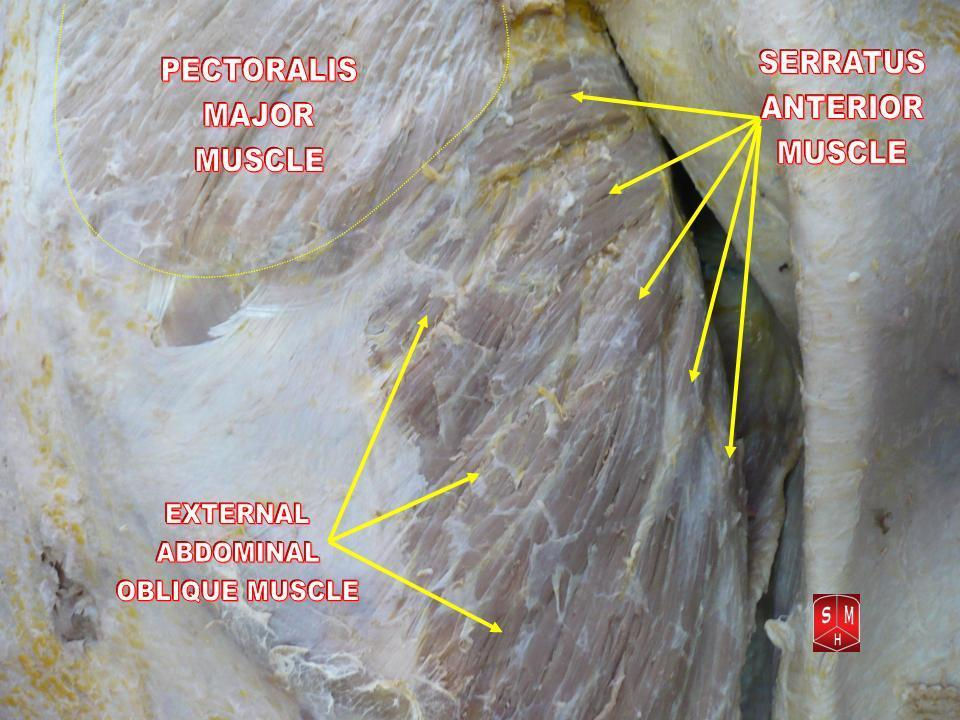
Serratus anterior muscle

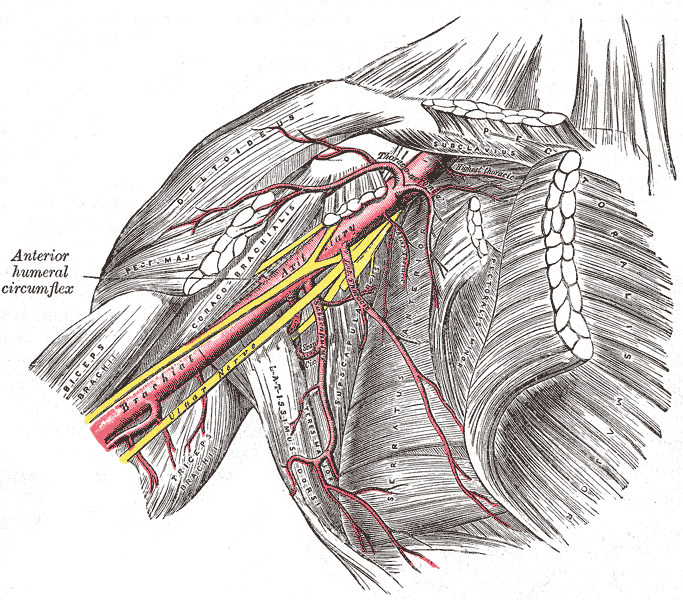
The axillary artery and its branches. The SA is seen alongside the pec minor.

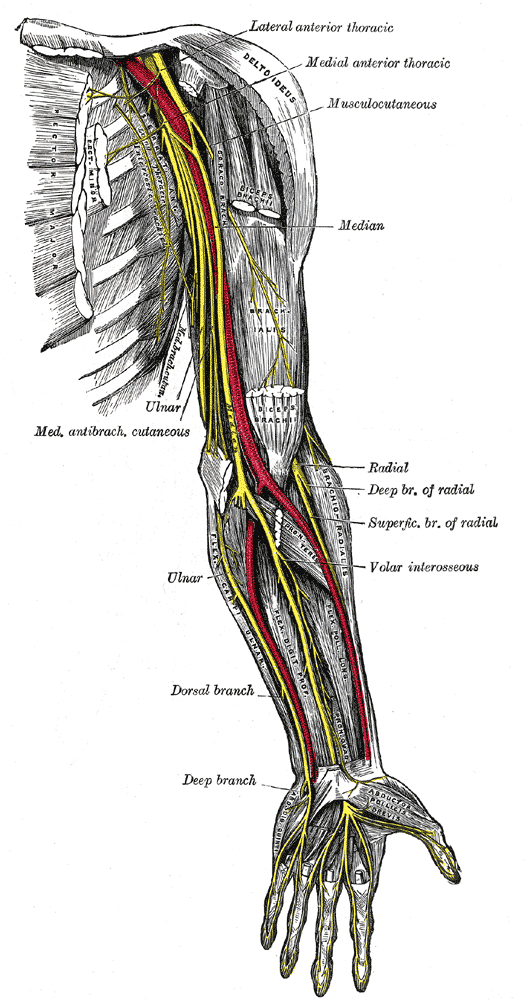
Nerves of the left upper extremity. The SA is seen to the left of the red line.

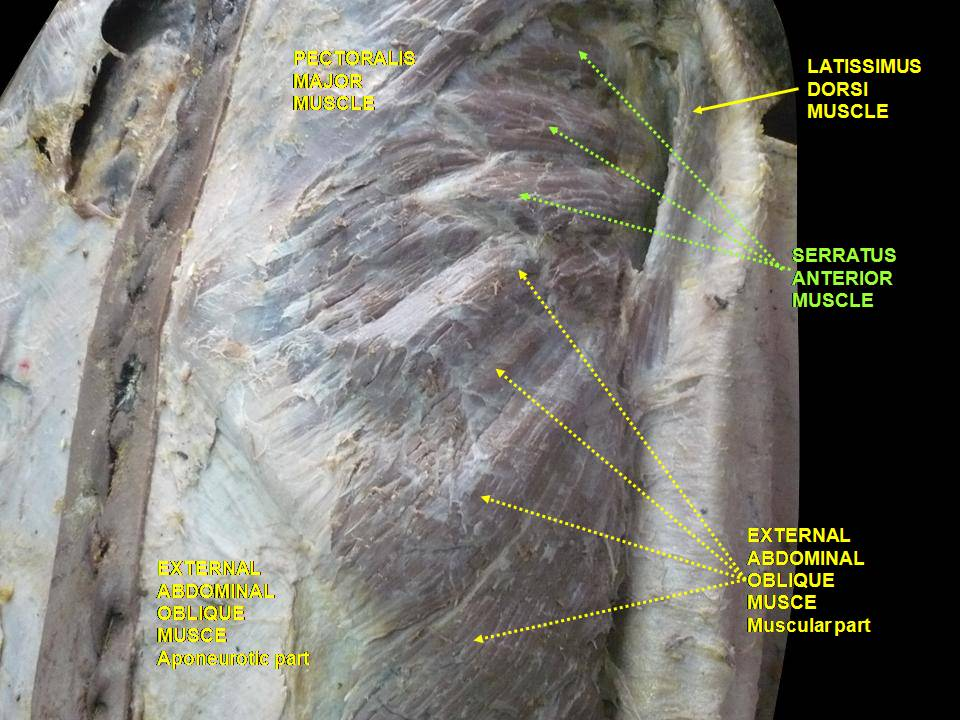
Serratus anterior muscle. Anterior thoracic wall. External abdominal oblique muscle. Deep dissection, anterior view.

== See also ==
- Serratus punch
- Pectoralis minor muscle
- Serratus posterior inferior muscle
- Serratus posterior superior muscle
- Backpack palsy
