= Dorsal scapular nerve =

Branch of the brachial plexus that supplies rhomboid muscles and levator scapulae

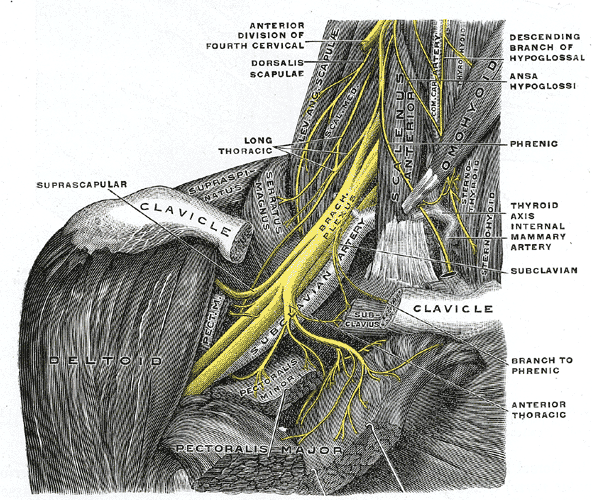
- The right brachial plexus with its short branches, viewed from in front. (Dorsalis scapulae labeled at left, second from top.)

Details
- From: C5 of brachial plexus
- Innervates: Rhomboid minor, rhomboid major, levator scapulae

Identifiers
- Latin: nervus dorsalis scapulae
- TA98: A14.2.03.011
- TA2: 6409
- FMA: 65279

The dorsal scapular nerve is a branch of the brachial plexus, usually derived from the ventral ramus of cervical nerve C5. It provides motor innervation to the rhomboid major muscle, rhomboid minor muscle, and levator scapulae muscle.

Dorsal scapular nerve syndrome can cause a winged scapula, with pain and limited motion.

== Structure ==
=== Origin ===
The dorsal scapular nerve arises from the brachial plexus, usually from the plexus root (anterior (ventral) ramus) of cervical nerve C5.

=== Course and relations ===
Once the nerve leaves C5 it commonly pierces the middle scalene muscle. It continues deep to levator scapulae muscle and the rhomboids (minor superior to major).

The nerve is accompanied by dorsal scapular artery.

== Function ==
The dorsal scapular nerve provides motor innervation to the two rhomboid muscles, and the levator scapulae muscle.

== Clinical significance ==
Injury to the dorsal scapular nerve is usually apparent on inspection when the scapula on the injured side is located farther from the midline than the uninjured scapula. The patient would be unable to pull their shoulder back, as when standing at attention. Isolated dorsal scapular nerve injury is uncommon, but case reports usually involve injury to the scalene muscles.

The dorsal scapular nerve is typically not anaesthetised during a supraclavicular nerve block. This can cause pain after some surgeries.

=== Dorsal scapular nerve syndrome ===
Dorsal scapular nerve syndrome can be caused by nerve compression syndrome. A winged scapula is the most common symptom. Shoulder pain may occur. It causes weakness in rhomboid major muscle, rhomboid minor muscle, and levator scapulae muscle. The condition can cause the upper trapezius muscle to become overactive. The range of motion of the shoulder may be limited. Treatment is usually conservative.

== See also ==
- Dorsal scapular artery

== Additional images ==
Brachial plexus

Brachial plexus with courses of spinal nerves shown

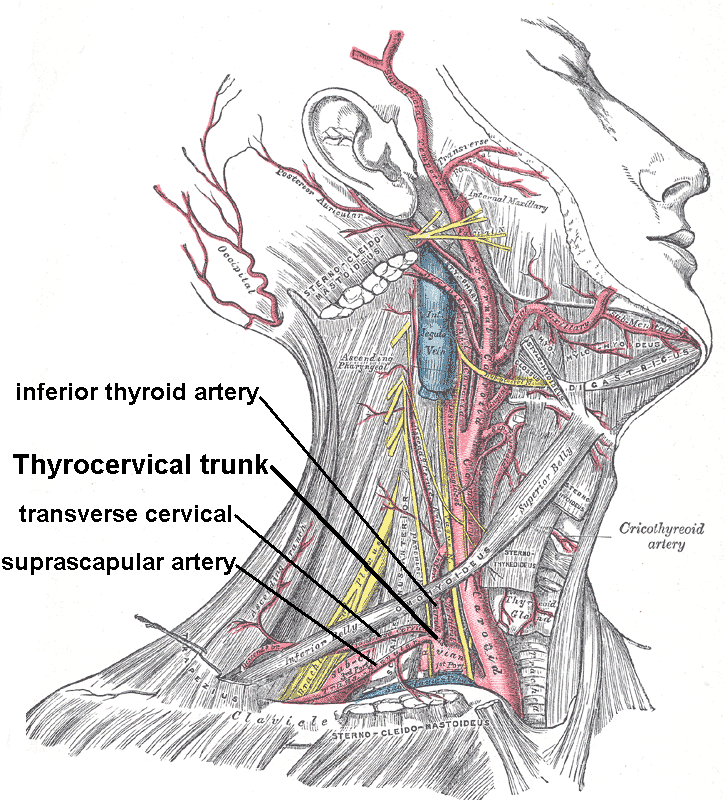
Deep Branch of Transverse Cervical running with Dorsal Scapular
