= Rhomboid minor muscle =

Skeletal muscle of the upper back

Rhomboid minor
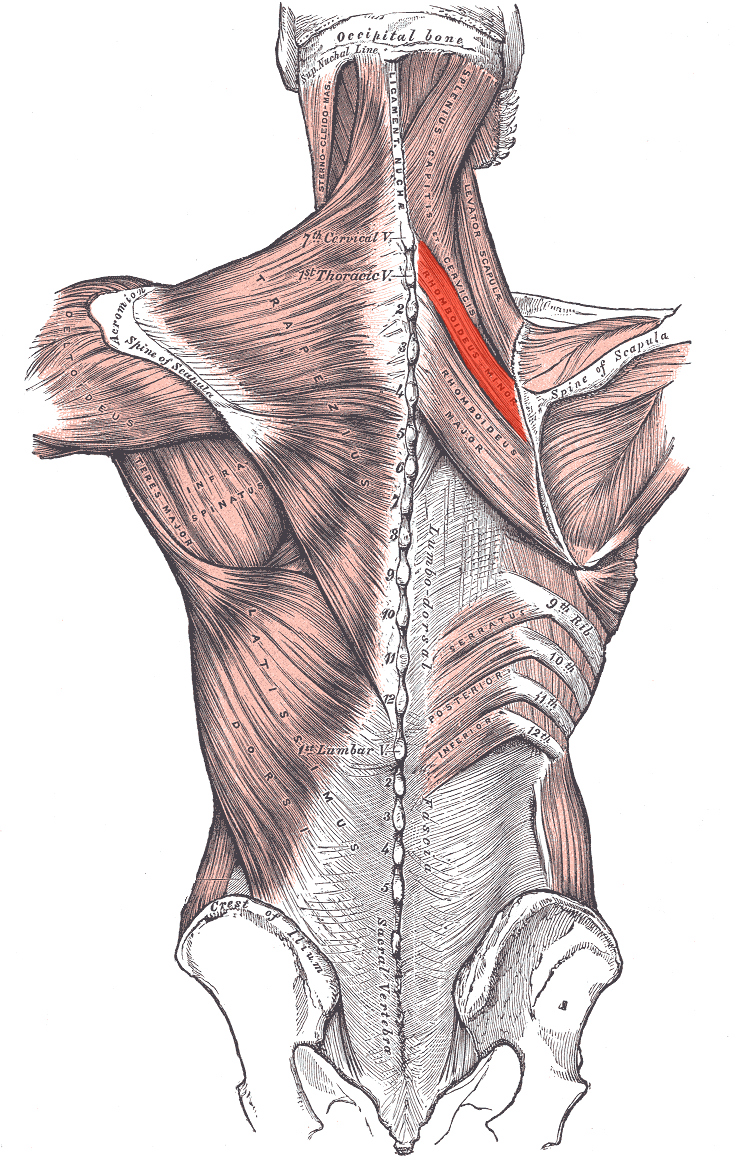
- Muscles connecting the upper extremity to the vertebral column. (Rhomboid minor in red)

Details
- Origin: Nuchal ligaments and spinous processes of C7-T1
- Insertion: Medial border of scapula, superior to the insertion of rhomboid major muscle
- Artery: Deep branch of transverse cervical artery
- Nerve: Dorsal scapular nerve (C4–5)
- Actions: Retracts and rotates scapula, fixes scapula to thoracic wall
- Antagonist: Serratus anterior

Identifiers
- Latin: musculus rhomboideus minor
- TA98: A04.3.01.008
- TA2: 2233
- FMA: 13380

In human anatomy, the rhomboid minor is a small skeletal muscle of the back that connects the scapula to the vertebrae of the spinal column. It arises from the nuchal ligament, the 7th cervical and 1st thoracic vertebrae and intervening supraspinous ligaments; it inserts onto the medial border of the scapula, and is innervated by the dorsal scapular nerve. It acts together with the rhomboid major to keep the scapula pressed against the thoracic wall.

== Anatomy ==
=== Origin ===
The rhomboid minor arises from the inferior border of the nuchal ligament, from the spinous processes of the vertebrae C7–T1, and from the intervening supraspinous ligaments.

=== Insertion ===
It inserts onto a small area of the medial border of the scapula at the level of the scapular spine.

=== Innervation ===
It is innervated by the dorsal scapular nerve (a branch of the brachial plexus), with most of its fibers derived from the C5 nerve root and only minor contribution from C4 or C6.

=== Blood supply ===
The rhomboid minor receives arterial blood supply from the dorsal scapular artery.

=== Relations ===
It is located inferior to levator scapulae, and superior to rhomboid major.

It lies deep to trapezius, and superficial to the long spinal muscles.

=== Variation ===
It is usually separated from the rhomboid major by a slight interval, but the adjacent margins of the two muscles are occasionally united.

=== Actions/movements ===
Together with the rhomboid major, the rhomboid minor retracts the scapula when the trapezius is contracted. Acting as a synergist to the trapezius, the rhomboid major and minor elevate the medial border of the scapula medially and upward, working in tandem with the levator scapulae muscle to rotate the scapulae downward. While other shoulder muscles are active, the rhomboid major and minor stabilize the scapula.

== Additional images ==
Position of rhomboid minor muscle (shown in red)

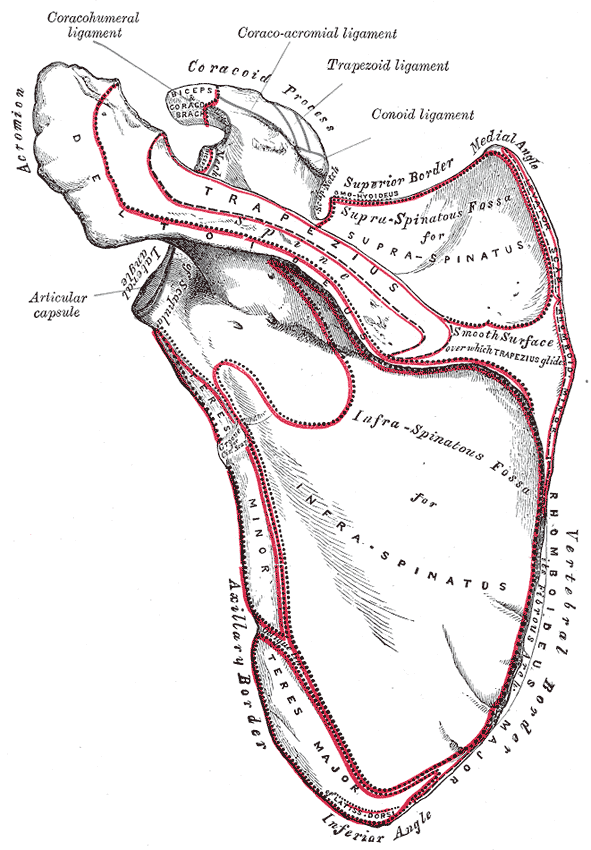
Left scapula. Dorsal surface.

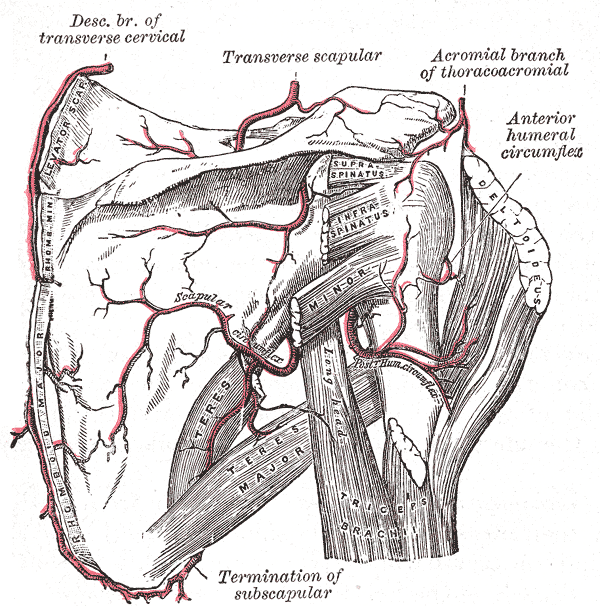
The scapular and circumflex arteries

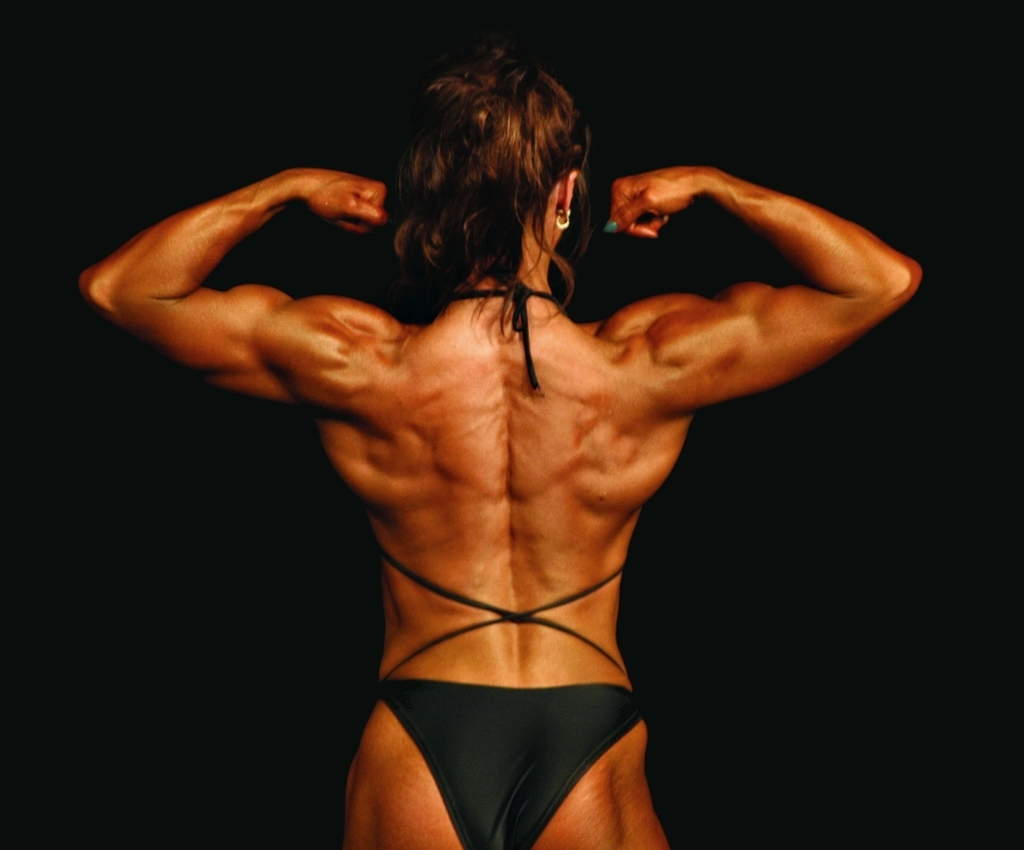
Full back muscle flex
