= Rhomboid muscles =

Upper back muscles

Rhomboid muscle
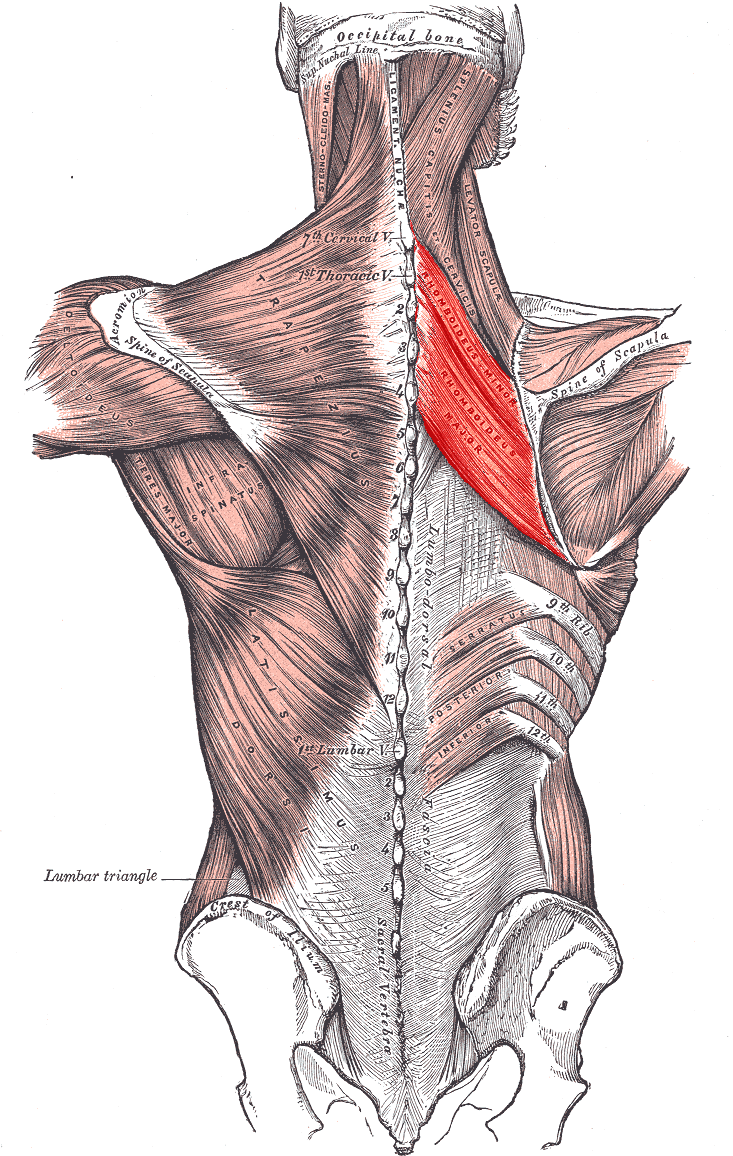
- Muscles connecting the upper extremity to the vertebral column.

Details
- Origin: Nuchal ligaments, spinous processes of the C7-to-T5 vertebrae
- Insertion: Medial border of the scapula
- Artery: Dorsal scapular artery
- Nerve: Dorsal scapular nerve
- Actions: Pulls scapulae medially, rotates scapulae, holds scapulae into thorax wall

Identifiers
- Latin: musculi rhomboidei

The rhomboid muscles (/ˈrɒmbɔɪd/), often simply called the rhomboids, are rhombus-shaped muscles associated with the scapula. There are two rhomboid muscles on each side of the upper back:

- Rhomboid major muscle
- Rhomboid minor muscle

The large rhombus-shaped muscle, located under the trapezius muscle, in the upper part of the thoracic region of the back, and the small muscle, in the same way, participate in the movement of the scapula. Their functions are the following:

- Drawing scapula superomedially
- Supporting scapula
- Rotating glenoid cavity inferiorly

Both muscles are innervated by the dorsal scapular nerve, a branch of the brachial plexus.

== Additional images ==
Rhomboid muscles.
Rhomboid minor muscle
Rhomboid major muscle

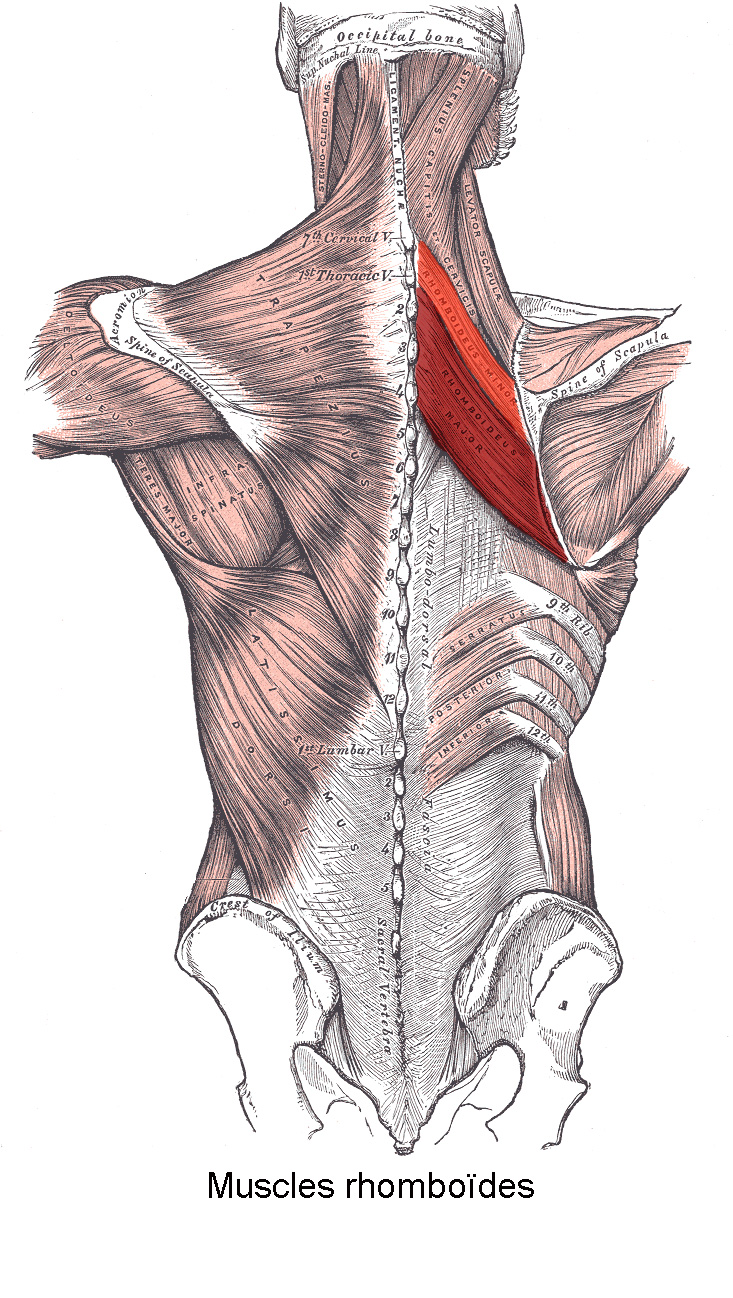
Rhomboid muscles.

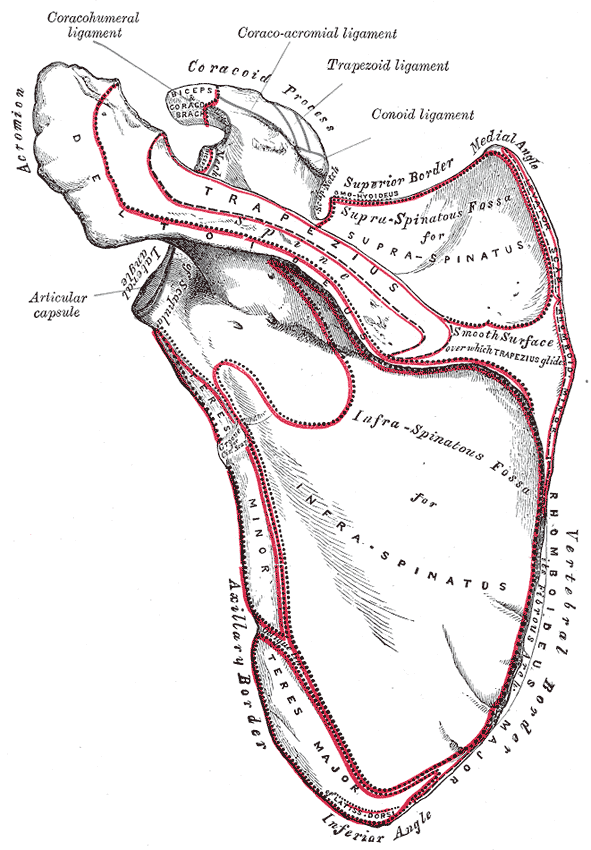
Left scapula. Posterior surface.

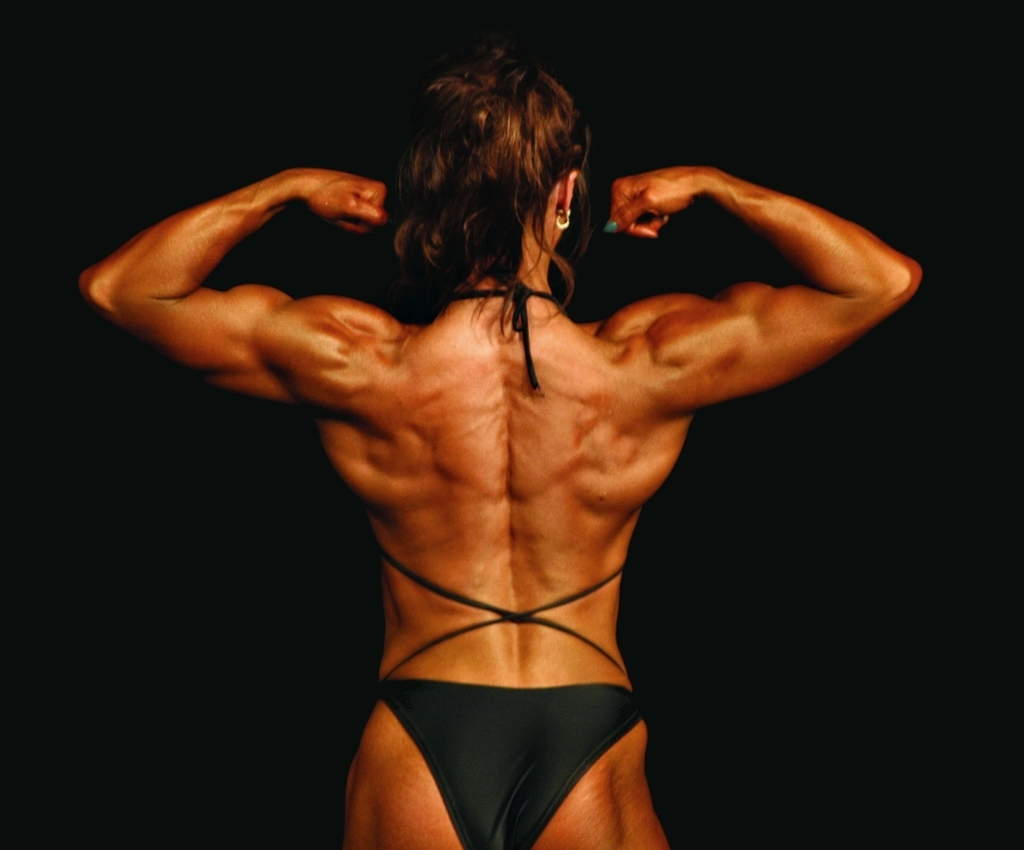
Full back muscle flex
