= Subscapular nerves =

Nerves that control the shoulder blade

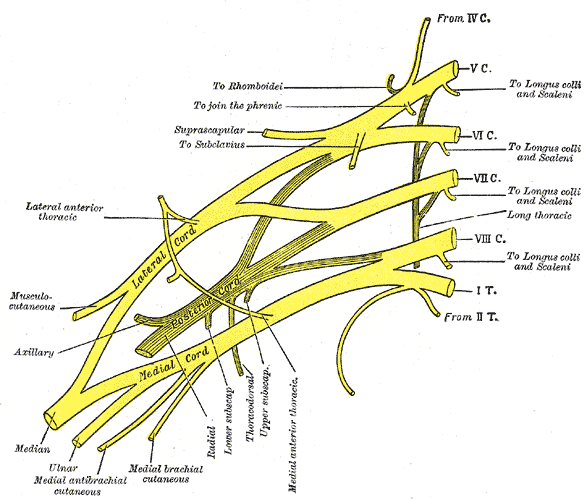
- Plan of brachial plexus (label for upper and lower subscapular nerves at bottom center)

Details
- From: Posterior cord
- Innervates: Subscapularis, latissimus dorsi muscle (only middle subscapular nerve), and teres major muscle (only lower subscapular nerve)

Identifiers
- Latin: nervus subscapularis
- TA98: A14.2.03.015
- TA2: 6427
- FMA: 65287

Subscapular nerves can refer to:

- Upper subscapular nerve
- Thoracodorsal nerve (middle subscapular nerve)
- Lower subscapular nerve

The subscapular nerves originate from the posterior cord of the brachial plexus. These nerves are part of a group of nerves that innervate the muscles that move the scapula. The upper subscapular nerve innervates the upper portion of the subscapularis muscle. The middle subscapular nerve, known as the thoracodorsal nerve, innervates the latissimus dorsi muscle. The lower subscapular nerve contains two branches. One branch inserts into the lower portion of the subscapularis muscle and the other branch inserts into the teres major. In some individuals, accessory upper subscapular nerve or accessory lower subscapular nerve may be found.
