= List of anatomy mnemonics =

This is a list of human anatomy mnemonics, categorized and alphabetized. For mnemonics in other medical specialties, see this list of medical mnemonics. Mnemonics serve as a systematic method for remembrance of functionally or systemically related items within regions of larger fields of study, such as those found in the study of specific areas of human anatomy, such as the bones in the hand, the inner ear, or the foot, or the elements comprising the human biliary system or arterial system.

== Bones ==
=== Bones of the Upper Limbs ===
How Rare U Cook Mesquite Pork?

He Runs Up Cold Mountains Panting

Hurry! Ralph Untie Carol's Mini Pechay

He Races Until Chunky Men Pace

- Humerus
- Radius
- Ulna
- Carpal bones
- Metacarpal bones
- Phalanges

(In order from proximal to distal)

==== Bones of the Arm ====
"Ultra Red Hair"

"Ultimate Rave Headquarters

Usually Really Hard

Unemployment Rises High

- Ulna
- Radius
- Humerus

===== Ulna =====
Understand

Listen

Name

A bone

==== Bones of the Hand ====
"Please Make Cookies"

"Please Massage Chest"

People Make Choices

- Phalanges
- Metacarpal bones
- Carpal bones

(These are in order from the distal end of the fingertips to the wrist)

===== Carpal bones =====
- Carpal Bones:

Sally Left The Party To Take Cathy Home:

She Looks Too Pretty Try To Catch Her:

Some Lovers Try Positions That They Can't Handle:
Scaphoid, Lunate, Triquetrum, Pisiform, Trapezium, Trapezoid, Capitate, Hamate.

- Carpal bones:

So Long To Pinky, Here Comes The Thumb:
Scaphoid, Lunate, Triquetrum, Pisiform, Hamate, Capitate, Trapezoid, Trapezium.

- Carpal Bones:

===== Bones of the Phalanges =====
Damn My Pinky!

Dick Move Pal!

Distance My People

Don't Make Problems

- Distal phalanx
- Middle phalanx
- Proximal phalanx

(From distal to proximal.)

=== Bones of the head ===
==== Cranial Bones ====
F POETS "Fluffy Puppies On Every Third Street"

Fit People Occasionally Eat Table Salt

Fat People Only Eat Thick Steak

Funny People Over Entertainment Try Songs

- Frontal
- Parietal
- Occipital
- Ethmoid
- Temporal
- Sphenoid

Fraternity Parties Occasionally Teach Spam Etiquette

- Frontal
- Parietal
- Occipital
- Temporal
- Sphenoid
- Ethmoid

Old People From Texas Eat Spiders

- Occipital
- Parietal
- Frontal
- Temporal
- Ethmoid
- Sphenoid

==== Vomer ====
Very bad

Odor

Makes my

Eyes

Run

=== Bones of the Pectoral Girdle and Arm ===
CS

Clearwater Sucks

Crazy Seals

- Clavicle
- Scapula

=== Spine (Vertebral Column) ===
Can This Little Servant Cook ?

- Cervical vertebrae (Atlas (anatomy) = C1, Axis (anatomy) = C2)
- Thoracic vertebrae
- Lumbar vertebrae
- Sacral vertebrae
- Coccygeal vertebrae

(These are in order superior to inferior- or starting from the top of the spine to the bottom.)

"Can Tall Ladies Sit Comfortably"

"Can The Ladies Stand Comfortably"

"Candy Takes Liking Stripping Catiously"

Can Tinkerbell Let Stars Collide?

- Breakfast at 7:00 - 7 cervical vertebrae
- Lunch at 12:00 - 12 thoracic vertebrae
- Dinner at 5:00 - 5 lumbar vertebrae

=== Projections of Bone ===
PTTTCC "People Take Teaspoons Temporarily Causing Constipation

- Process
- Tubercle
- Tuberosity
- Trochanter
- Condyle
- Crest

==== Humerus tubercles (Bone projections) ====
Humerus tubercles

Girls In Leadership

- Greater tubercle
- Intertubercular groove
- Lesser tubercle

==== Bone Markings of Humerus ====
Let's Rewatch Criminal Minds

Let's Roll Clay Moons

- L-lateral epicondyle
- R-radial fossa
- C-coronoid fossa
- M-medial epicondyle

=== Holes and Depressions in Bones ===
FFNF "Fireman Fight Notorious Fires

Flowers Flow Neatly Fabulously

Family Feuds are No Fun

- Foramen
- Fissure
- Notch
- Fossa

== Muscles ==
=== Rotator Cuff Muscles ===
SITS

"Sit In The Seat" / The humerus SITS in the glenoid fossa

Shit I Trusted Sam

Swimming In The Summer

She Is The Scientist

- Supraspinatus
- Infraspinatus
- Teres Minor
- Subscapularis

Scooby Investigated The Mysterious Scene

- Supraspinatus
- Infraspinatus
- Teres Minor
- Subscapularis

=== Flexor muscles of the arm ===
3 Bs bend the elbow: (in order of location)

 Biceps brachii 
 Brachialis
 Brachioradialis

==== Anterior Flexor Muscles of the Forearm ====
Cats Run Circles Under Dogs Stomachs

Can't Really Come Until Day Six

- Carpi
- Radialis
- Carpi
- Ulnaris
- Digitorum
- Superficialis

=== Anterior leg Compartment (muscles) ===
"The Hospitals Are Not Dirty Places"

- Tibialis anterior
- extensor Hallucis longus
- anterior tibial Artery
- deep fibular Nerve
- extensor Digitorum longus
- Peroneus tertius [aka fibularis tertius]

"Those Horses Are Never Doing Pilates"

- Tibialis anterior
- extensor Hallucis longus
- anterior tibial Artery
- deep fibular Nerve
- extensor Digitorum longus
- Peroneus tertius [aka fibularis tertius]

"Tom Had A Night Down Town"

- Tibialis anterior
- extensor Hallucis longus
- anterior tibial Artery
- deep fibular Nerve
- extensor Digitorum longus
- Tertius for fibularis tertius

=== Posterior Leg Compartment (Posterior Ankle Structures) ===
Tom Dig A Nice Hole

- Tibialis posterior
- Flexor Digitorum longus
- Artery - Posterior tibial artery
- Nerve - Tibial nerve
- Flexor Hallucis longus

Tom, Dick, And Very Naughty Harry

- Tibialis posterior
- Flexor Digitorum longus
- Posterior tibial Artery
- Posterior tibial Vein
- Tibial Nerve
- Flexor Hallucis longus

Tom, Dick, And Very Nervous Harry

- Tibialis posterior
- Flexor Digitorum longus
- Posterior tibial Artery
- Posterior tibial Vein
- Tibial Nerve
- Flexor Hallucis longus

== Joint, suture, ligament, tendon ==
=== Joint In The Wrist ===
RIC "Rice Is Curing

- Radiocarpal
- Intercarpal
- Carpometacarpal

RIC "Really Interesting Crap

- Radiocarpal
- Intercarpal
- Carpometacarpal

Roads In California

- Radiocarpal
- Intercarpal
- Carpometacarpal

Rum In Coke

- Radiocarpal
- Intercarpal
- Carpometacarpal

=== Joints/Sutures of Skull ===
CLSS "Crazy Llamas Sassing Santa

- Coronal suture
- Lambdoid suture
- Squamosal suture
- Sagittal suture

The Lazy Cat Sleeps Safely

- Temporomandibular joint
- Lambdoid suture
- Coronal suture
- Squamous suture
- Sagittal suture

"Come Sing Love Songs"

- Coronal Suture
- Sagittal Suture
- Lambdoid Suture
- Squamous Suture

"Come Smoke L 's Sam

- Coronal Suture
- Sagittal Suture
- Lambdoid Suture
- Squamous Suture

"Can Seagulls Lift Snacks

- Coronal Suture
- Sagittal Suture
- Lambdoid Suture
- Squamous Suture

=== Pes anserinus ===
A mnemonic to remember the muscles that contribute tendons to the pes anserinus and the innervations of these muscles is SGT FOT (sergeant FOT)

- S- Sartorius
- G- Gracilis
- T- semiTendinosus (from anterior to posterior).
- F- femoral nerve
- O- obturator nerve
- T- tibial division of the sciatic nerve.

Notice the order of the muscles (S, G, T) follows the order of the innervating nerves which correspond to those muscles (F, O, T)

Another anterior to posterior is “Say Grace before Tea” Sartorius, Gracilis, semiTendinosus.

== Vessels ==
=== Celiac trunk(Coeliac trunk): branches ===
Left Hand Side (LHS):

- Left gastric artery
- Hepatic artery
- Splenic artery

=== Tributaries of the Inferior vena cava ===
"I Like To Rise So High"

- Iliac vein (common)
- Lumbar vein
- Testicular (gonadal) vein (direct tributary on right side; empties into left renal vein -> IVC on left side)
- Renal vein
- Suprarenal vein (same drainage as gonadal vein)
- Hepatic vein

=== Subclavian artery ===
The branches of the subclavian artery can be remembered using VITamin C and D.

- Vertebral Artery
- Internal Thoracic Artery
- Thyrocervical Trunk
- Costocervical Artery
- Dorsal Scapular Artery

=== Internal iliac artery: branches ===
I Like Going Places Using My Very Own Unmanned Vehicle
Posterior division:

- Iliolumbar artery
- Lateral sacral artery
- Superior gluteal artery

Anterior division:

- Inferior gluteal artery
- Internal pudendal artery
- Umbilical artery
- Middle rectal artery
- Superior and inferior vesical artery
- Obturator artery
- Uterine artery (female)
- Vaginal artery (female)

== Contents of canal & foramen ==
=== Mediastinum ===
==== Superior mediastinum ====
The contents of superior mediastinum can be remembered using the mnemonic, "TT ET AV N LO"

or

"Try To Eat Toast And Vitamins Now Little Oliver"

- Thymus
- Trachea
- Esophagus
- Thoracic duct
- Aortic arch
- Veins (Superior vena cava, brachiocephalic vein, left superior intercostal vein)
- Nerves (Vagus nerve, phrenic nerve, left recurrent laryngeal nerve)
- Lymphatics
- Other small arteries and veins

==== Inferior mediastinum ====
===== Anterior inferior mediastinum =====
The contents of anterior inferior mediastinum can be remembered using the mnemonic, "RT LN"

or

"ReTweet Light Novels!"

- Remnants of the Thymus (inferior portion of thymus)
- Lymph Nodes

===== Middle inferior mediastinum =====
The contents of middle inferior mediastinum can be remembered using the mnemonic, "PHP P ASP" or "PHP plus ASP"

or

"'Personal Home Page' plus 'Active Server Pages'"

- Phrenic nerve
- Heart
- Pericardium
- Pericardiacophrenic artery
- Ascending aorta
- Superior vena cava
- Pulmonary trunk

===== Posterior inferior mediastinum =====
The contents of posterior inferior mediastinum can be remembered using the mnemonic, "DATE VSL"

or

"on the DATE Vivian Slapped Larry"

- Descending thoracic aorta
- Azygos veins (hemiazygos veins, accessory hemiazygos veins)
- Thoracic duct (Cisterna chyli)
- Esophagus (Esophageal plexus)
- Vagus nerve
- Splanchnic nerve (greater splanchnic nerve, lesser splanchnic nerve, least splanchnic nerve)
- Lymphatics

The contents of posterior mediastinum can be remembered using the mnemonic, "DATES"

- Descending aorta
- Azygous vein and hemiazygos vein
- Thoracic duct
- Esophagus
- Sympathetic trunk/ganglia.

=== Foramen magnum ===
Contents of the foramen magnum: VAMPS-AT-SD

or

VAMPires Sing AT SD card

- Vertebral arteries
- Anterior spinal artery
- Meninges associated with the spinal cord
- Posterior spinal arteries
- Spinal roots of the accessory nerve (CN XI)
- Apical ligament of the dens
- Tectorial membrane
- Spinal cord
- Dural veins (Dural venous sinuses)

VAMPires Stalk At Twilight Seaking Damsels/Darkness

VAMPires Sing AT SunDown

Contents of the foramen magnum: VAMPS-ATM

or

VAMPires Sing AT Midnight

- Vertebral arteries
- Anterior spinal artery
- Meningeal branches of the cervical nerves
- Posterior spinal arteries
- Spinal part of the accessory nerve
- Alar and apical ligaments of the dens
- Tectorial membrane
- Medulla oblongata

=== Greater sciatic foramen ===
Structures passing through greater sciatic foramen below piriformis (S.N.I.P. N.I.P.)

- sciatic nerve
- nerve to obturator internus
- internal pudendal vessel
- pudendal nerve
- nerve to quadratus femoris
- inferior gluteal vessels
- posterior cutaneous nerve of thigh

=== Lesser sciatic foramen ===
Structures passing through lesser sciatic foramen: (P.I.N.T.)

- pudendal nerve
- internal pudendal vessels
- nerve to obturator internus
- tendon of obturator internus

=== Tarsal tunnel ===
a mnemonic to remember the contents of the Tarsal tunnel from anterior to posterior is "Tom, Dick and Harry". or alternatively "Tom, Dick (and very nervous) Harry" if the artery, vein, and nerve are included.

=== Femoral triangle ===
The femoral triangle is shaped like the sail of a sailing ship and hence its boundaries can be remembered using the mnemonic, "SAIL":

- Sartorius
- Adductor longus
- Inguinal Ligament.

The order of structures in the femoral triangle is important in the embalming of bodies, as the femoral artery is often exposed and used to pump embalming fluids into the body. The order of this neurovascular bundle can be remembered using the mnemonic, "NAVY":

- Nerve
- Artery
- Vein
- Y -fronts (the British term of a style of men's underwear with a Y-shaped front that acts as a fly). The "Y" is midline (corresponding with the penis) and the mnemonic always reads from lateral to medial (in other words, the Femoral Nerve is always lateral).

An alternate to this mnemonic is "NAVEL" for Nerve, Artery, Vein, Empty Space and Lymph, to include the deep inguinal lymph nodes located medial to the Femoral vein.

=== Popliteal fossa ===
A useful mnemonic to remember popliteal fossa anatomy (medial-to-lateral arrangement) is: Serve And Volley Next Ball.

- S: semimembranosus and semitendinosus (superior medial border)
- A: artery (popliteal artery)
- V: vein (popliteal vein)
- N: nerve (tibial nerve)
- B: biceps femoris (superior lateral border). The lateral and medial heads of gastrocnemius form the inferior border.

Or Serve Aunt Vivvien Next Bowl

=== Carotid sheath contents ===
I See 10 CC's in the IV:^{p. 1}

- I See (I.C.) = Internal Carotid artery
- 10 = CN 10 (Vagus nerve)
- CC = Common Carotid artery
- IV = Internal Jugular Vein

=== Cavernous sinus contents ===
O TOM CAT:^{p. 1}

O TOM are lateral wall components, in order from superior to inferior.

CA are the components within the sinus, from medial to lateral. CA ends at the level of T from O TOM.

- Occulomotor nerve (III)
- Trochlear nerve (IV)
- Ophthalmic nerve (V1)
- Maxillary nerve (V2)
- Carotid artery
- Abducent nerve (VI)
- T: When written, connects to the T of OTOM

== Vertebral level ==
=== Diaphragm apertures: spinal levels ===
Many mnemonics are used for diaphragm apertures including:

==== (V)oice (O)f (A)merica ====
number of letters = vertebral level

- V - vena cava - T8
- O - oesophagus - T10
- A - aortic hiatus - T12

- Vena cava = 8 letters = T8^{p. 1}
- Oesophagus = 10 letters = T10
- Aortic hiatus = 12 letters = T12

==== Openings of the diaphragm and structures passing through ====
"I Read, Very Old, And Torn Articles." - (IVC, Right phrenic nerve), (Vagus nerve, Oesophagus), (Aorta, Thoracic duct, Azygos vein).

Openings of the diaphragm and structures passing through

- Caval opening (vena caval foramen) (2: IR): Inferior vena cava, (branches of the) Right phrenic nerve
- Esophageal hiatus (2: VO): (anterior and posterior) Vagal trunks, Oesophagus
- Aortic hiatus (3: ATA): (descending) Aorta, Thoracic duct, Azygos vein

==== I ate 10 eggs at 12 ====
- I = IVC
- ate = T8
- 10 = T10
- Eggs = Esophagus
- At = Aorta
- 12 = T12

=== Sternal angle ===
The sternal angle marks the approximate level of the 2nd pair of costal cartilages, which attach to the second ribs, and the level of the intervertebral disc between T4 and T5. In clinical applications, the sternal angle can be palpated at the T4 vertebral level.

The sternal angle is used in the definition of the thoracic plane. This marks the level of a number of other anatomical structures.

For structures lying at the level of the sternal angle, the following mnemonic can be used:

==== RAT PLLANT ====
- Rib 2
- Aortic arch
- Tracheal bifurcation
- Pulmonary trunk
- Ligamentum arteriosum
- Left recurrent laryngeal
- Azygos Vein
- Nerves (Cardiac and Pulmonary plexuses)
- Thoracic duct

==== PLOT of EARTH PLLANTS ====
is a more detailed mnemonic including:

- Phrenic and Vagus Nerve
- Lymph Nodes
- Oblique fissure of lungs (top of it)
- Thymus
- Esophagus (trending right to left)
- Aortic Arch (bottom of the arch)
- Rib 2, Manubrium-sternal angle, T4(more specifically T4-5 disc)
- Tracheal Bifurcation (Carina: Latin –like keel of boat)
- Heart
- Pulmonary trunk bifurcation
- L2 : Left Recurrent Laryngeal (Looping under Aorta); Ligamentum Arteriosum: Connects Aortic Arch to Pulmonary. Bifurcation
- Azygous vein arches over the root of the Rt. Lung and opens in SVC.
- Nerve plexi: Cardiac and Pulmonary Plexus
- Thoracic duct (on its way to drain into the Left Subclavian)
- SVC going down

== Neuroanatomy ==
=== Afferent vs efferent ===
Afferent connection arrives and an efferent connection exits.

=== Brachial plexus ===
Remember To Drink Cold Beer - Roots, Trunks, Divisions, Cords, Branches

- 5 main nerves of brachial plexus.
  - "My Aunty Rocks My Uncle" - Musculocutaneous, Axillary, Radial, Median, Ulnar. (in order laterally to medially)
  - "My Uncle Rocks My Aunt" - Musculocutaneous (L), Ulnar (M), Radial (P), Median (LM), Axillary (P). (L: lateral cord, M: medial cord, P: posterior cord. LM: both lateral and medial cords. Memorize "LMP LMP".)

- Lateral cord branches
  - LLM "Lucy Loves Me" - Lateral pectoral, Lateral root of the median nerve, Musculocutaneous.
  - Love Me Lucy (LML) - Lateral pectoral nerve, Musculocutaneous nerve, Lateral root of Median nerve.
  - Look My Lancer - Lateral pectoral nerve, Musculocutaneous nerve, Lateral root of Median nerve.
- Medial cord branches
  - MMMUM "Most Medical Men Use Morphine" - Medial pectoral, Medial cutaneous nerve of arm, Medial cutaneous nerve of forearm, Ulnar, Medial root of the Median nerve.
  - "Money Makes Many Men Unhappy" - Medial pectoral nerve, Medial cutaneous nerve of arm, Medial cutaneous nerve of forearm, Medial root of median nerve, Ulnar nerve.
  - "M4U" - Medial pectoral nerve, Medial cutaneous nerve of arm, Medial cutaneous nerve of forearm, Medial root of median nerve, Ulnar nerve.
  - Union of 4 Medials - Ulnar nerve, Medial cutaneous nerve of arm, Medial cutaneous nerve of forearm, Medial pectoral nerve, Medial root of Median nerve.
- Posterior cord branches
  - STAR - Subscapular (upper and lower), Thoracodorsal, Axillary, Radial.
  - RATS- Radial nerve, Axillary nerve, Thoracodorsal nerve, Subscapular (Upper & Lower) nerve.
  - ULTRA - Upper subscapular, Lower subscapular, Thoracodorsal, Radial, Axillary.
  - ULNAR- Upper subscapular nerve, Lower subscapular nerve, Nerve to latissimus dorsi, Axillary nerve, Radial nerve.

=== Cerebellum ===
Deep cerebellar nuclei and their positions relative to the midline: "Fat Guys Eat Donuts," where each letter indicates the medial to lateral location in the cerebellar white matter.

Or inversely, "Don't Eat Greasy Food", where each letter indicates the lateral to medial location in the cerebellar white matter.

- fastigial nucleus
- globose nucleus
- emboliform nucleus
- dentate nucleus

=== Cranial nerves ===
==== 12 Cranial Nerves ====
On Occasion Of Parties, The Attractive Faces Are Girl Visitors. Say Hello!

- CN I Olfactory nerve
- CN II Optic nerve
- CN III Oculomotor nerve
- CN IV Trochlear nerve (Pathetic nerve)
- CN V Trigeminal nerve (Dentist's nerve)
- CN VI Abducens nerve
- CN VII Facial nerve
- CN VIII Vestibulocochlear nerve (Auditory nerve)
- CN IX Glossopharyngeal nerve
- CN X Vagus nerve
- CN XI Accessory nerve (Spinal accessory nerve)
- CN XII Hypoglossal nerve

List of mnemonics for the cranial nerves, their respective type and foramen
NERVE:	Olfactory nerve	Optic nerve	Oculomotor nerve	Trochlear nerve	Trigeminal nerve			Abducens nerve	Facial nerve	Vestibulocochlear nerve	Glossopharyngeal nerve	Vagus nerve	Accessory nerve	Hypoglossal nerve
NERVE:	Olfactory nerve	Optic nerve	Oculomotor nerve	Trochlear nerve	Ophthalmic	Maxillary	Mandibular	Abducens nerve	Facial nerve	Vestibulocochlear nerve	Glossopharyngeal nerve	Vagus nerve	Accessory nerve	Hypoglossal nerve
Mnemonic: (for nerve)	OLd	OPen	OCeans	TROuble	TRIbesmen			ABout	Fish	VEnom	Giving	VArious	ACute / SPlitting	Headaches
TYPE:	Sensory	Sensory	Motor	Motor	Both (sensory + motor)			Motor	Both	Sensory	Both	Both	Motor	Motor
Mnemonic: (for type)	Some	Say	Marry	Money,	But			My	Brother	Says	Big	Business	Makes	Money
FORAMINA:	Cribriform plate	Optic canal	Superior Orbital Fissure	Superior Orbital Fissure	Superior Orbital Fissure	Foramen Rotundum	Foramen Ovale	Superior Orbital Fissure	Internal Acoustic Meatus	Internal Acoustic Meatus	Jugular Foramen	Jugular Foramen	Jugular Foramen	Hypoglossal Canal
Mnemonics: (for foramina)	Cleaners	Only	Spray	Smelly	Stuff	Right	On	Smelly	Izods	In	Jumbled	Junkyards	Juggled	High
Mnemonics: (for foramina)	Carl	Only	Swims	South.	Silly	Roger	Only	Swims	In	Infiniti	Jacuzzis.	Jane	Just	Hitchhikes.

OOOh the 2 Traceys Are From Virginia Good cause Virginians Are Hilarious

On, On, On, They Traveled And Found Voldemort Guarding Very Ancient Horcruxes

There are many mnemonics for the names of the cranial nerves, e.g.

- "OOOTTAFAGVSH" is "OLd OPen OCeans TROuble TRIbesmen ABout Fish VEnom Giving VArious ACute/SPlitting Headaches" (a mnemonic that gives enough letters to distinguish between nerves that start with the same letter), or "On old Olympus's towering tops, a Finn and German viewed some hops," and for the initial letters "OOOTTAFVGVAH" is "Oh, oh, oh, to touch and feel very good velvet ... ah, heaven." The differences between these depend on "vestibulocochlear nerve" versus "acoustic nerve" and "accessory nerve" versus "spinal accessory nerve".

Old Ollie Oson Teaches Teenagers About Fashion Very Gladly Very Adequately Hilarious

Only Our Old Trusty Vodka And Friends Validate Great Victories, So Harmonious.

One Orange Orangutan Tries To Avoid Fragile Vines & Gracefully Vacates All Hazards

Ongoing Optimism Only Teaches True Amazing Fundamentals Varying Globally Versatile And Honesty

Only Old Otters Take Time And Find Very Good Values At Hand

Only One Ounce To Take Another Farmer's Very Great Vest And Hat

==== Functions of the Cranial Nerves ====
motor (M), sensory (S), or both (B)

Some Say Marry Money, But My Brother Says Big Business Makes Money.

A common example mnemonic for remembering which nerves are motor (M), sensory (S), or both (B), "Some Say Marry Money But My Brother Says Benevolent Bride Matters More". There are a very large number of additional mnemonics.

Summertime Seems More Majestic Because Multiple Bystanders Sing Brilliant Ballads Making Masterpieces

Silly Sally Makes Many Big Muffins But Sally Bakes Big Macarons Moreover

Some Sundays Make Me Bored, My Brother Stays Busy Building Miniature Models

Some Say Moms Make Boys Magnificent Because She Babies Boys Much More

Sometimes She May Muster Big Motors Because She Believes Both Men Matter

Some Say Marry Money But My Brother Says Big Brains Matter More

Some Say Marry Money, But My Buddy Says Brilliant Brains Make Money

==== 3 branches of the trigeminal nerve (CN V) ====
Standing room only can be used to remember that:

- V_{1} (ophthalmic nerve) passes through the superior orbital fissure
- V_{2} (maxillary nerve) through the foramen rotundum
- V_{3} (mandibular nerve) through the foramen ovale.

==== 5 branches of the facial nerve (CN VII) ====
For the five branches of the facial nerve there are: "Two Zebras Bit My Cookie" or "To Zanzibar By MotorCar" or "To Zoo By My Car"

- Temporal branch
- Zygomatic branch
- Buccal branch
- Marginal mandibular branch
- Cervical branch

=== Lateral geniculate nucleus (thalamus) ===
In neuroanatomy, the lateral geniculate nucleus is a structure in the thalamus and a key component of the mammalian visual pathway.

A simple mnemonic for remembering which layers of lateral geniculate body are synapsed with the ganglion cells of the ipsilateral or contralateral optic nerve is "See I? I see, I see," with "see" representing the C in "contralateral," and "I" representing the I in "ipsilateral." (CIICIC)

Another is "Emily and Pete meet eye to eye" as in "M and P meet I to I," or again, "Magno and Parvo meet Ipsi to Ipsi." (MMPPPP)

Another way of remembering which layers of lateral geniculate body are synapsed with the ganglion cells of the ipsilateral or contralateral optic nerve is 2+3=5 (layers II, III and V), which is correct, so it is from the same (ipsilateral) side as the ganglion cells from the side of question, while at the same time 1+4 doesn't equal 6, so the remaining layers (I, IV, and VI) are synapsing with ganglion cells of the other (contralateral) optic nerve.

=== Coronal section of brain (structures) ===
"In Extremis, Cannibals Eat People's Globus Pallidi Instead of Their Hearts":

From insula to midline:

- Insula
- Extream capsule
- Claustrum
- External capsule
- Putamen
- Globus pallidus
- Internal capsule
- Thalamus
- Hypothalamus

=== Anterior Pituitary Hormones ===
FLAG TOP

- FSH
- LH
- ACTH
- GH
- TSH
- MelanOcyte Stimulating Hormone
- Prolactin

== Etc. ==
=== Bowel components ===
"Dow Jones Industrial Average Closing Stock Report"

From proximal to distal:

- Duodenum
- Jejunum
- Ileum
- Appendix
- Colon
- Sigmoid
- Rectum

=== Duodenum: lengths of parts ===
"Counting 1 to 4 but staggered":^{p. 1}

- 1st part: 2 inches
- 2nd part: 3 inches
- 3rd part: 4 inches
- 4th part: 1 inch

=== Endocrine glands ===
The major glands of the endocrine system, excluding ovaries and testes: "T-A-P." (T2, A3, P4)

- Thymus
- Thyroid
- Anterior pituitary
- Adrenal cortex
- Adrenal medulla
- Posterior pituitary
- Parathyroid gland
- Pancreas
- Pineal

=== G.I. tract layers (simplified) ===
M.S.M.S.

- Mucosa
- Submucosa
- Muscularis propria (or muscularis externa)
- Serosa (or adventitia)

=== Kidney functions ===
A WET BED

- A – maintaining ACID-base balance
- W – maintaining WATER balance
- E – ELECTROLYTE balance
- T – TOXIN removal
- B – BLOOD Pressure control
- E – making ERYTHROPOIETIN
- D – Vitamin D metabolism

=== Placenta-crossing substances ===
WANT My Hot Dog

- Wastes
- Antibodies
- Nutrients
- Teratogens
- Microorganisms
- Hormones, HIV
- Drugs

=== Layers of the retina ===
A mnemonic to remember the layers of the retina:

My	Membrane (internal limiting)
Nerves	Nerve fibers
Get	Ganglions
In	Inner plexiform
Knots	Inner nuclear
Outside	Outer plexiform
Our	Outer nuclear
Easy	External limiting membrane
Practice	Photoreceptors
Review	Retinal pigment epithelium

=== Sperm: path through male reproductive system ===
"My boyfriend's name is STEVE":

- Seminiferous Tubules
- Epididymis
- Vas deferens
- Ejaculatory duct

=== Connective Tissue and Fascicles ===
- Every -Endomysium
- Person- Perimysium
- Eats- Epimysium
- Food - Fascia

=== Intraperitoneal and Retroperitoneal Organs ===
- Retroperitoneal organs in abdominal cavity (secondarily retroperitoneal organs are starred)
  - SAD PUCKER (includes esophagus, excludes inferior vena cava):
    - Suprarenal (adrenal) glands
    - Aorta
    - Duodenum (distal 1st part - 4th part)*
    - Pancreas*
    - Ureter
    - Colon (ascending and descending)*
    - Kidney
    - Esophagus
    - Rectum
  - KID CARPUS (includes inferior vena cava, excludes esophagus)
    - Kidney
    - Inferior vena cava
    - Duodenum (distal 1st part - 4th part)*
    - Colon (ascending and descending)*
    - Aorta
    - Rectum
    - Pancreas (head and body)*
    - Ureter
    - Suprarenal (adrenal) glands
- Intraperitoneal Organs
  - DJ CLASS PIG
    - Duodenum (proximal 1st part)
    - Jejunum
    - Colon (cecum, transverse, sigmoid)
    - Liver
    - Appendix
    - Stomach
    - Spleen
    - Pancreas (tail)
    - Ileum
    - Gallbladder

== See also ==
- Brachial plexus
- Cranial nerve
- List of medical mnemonics
