= Subscapular =

Subscapular means the area of the human back under the scapula. It may refer to:

- Subscapular artery
- Upper subscapular nerve
- Lower subscapular nerve
- Subscapularis muscle
