= Thoracodorsal =

Thoracodorsal may refer to:

- Thoracodorsal nerve
- Thoracodorsal artery
