= Roots of the median nerve =

Roots of the median nerve may refer to:

- Lateral root of median nerve
- Medial root of median nerve
