= Christian Gerber =

Swiss orthopedic surgeon

Christian Gerber (born 24 May 1952) is a Swiss orthopedic surgeon and professor emeritus of orthopedics at the University of Zurich. He was professor and chair of orthopedics at the University of Zurich and medical director of Balgrist University Hospital from 1995 to 2017. He is known for introducing latissimus dorsi tendon transfer for irreparable rotator cuff tears into shoulder surgery, and for identifying isolated subscapularis tears and describing the lift-off test for examining subscapularis function, which drew attention to the anterior rotator cuff.

== Early life and education ==
As a teenager, Gerber played football and, before a swimming accident at age 16, captained a Swiss junior national team. A serious neck injury ended his plans for a professional football career. His experience of treatment prompted his interest in medicine.

Gerber studied medicine at the University of Bern from 1971 to 1977, with clerkships at Yale University and the University of California, San Diego (UCSD), and completed his medical degree with a thesis on total knee arthroplasty supervised by Maurice E. Müller. His clinical training included internal medicine in Herzogenbuchsee, neurology in Bern, general surgery and traumatology in Davos, and orthopedic surgery under Reinhold Ganz at the Department of Orthopaedics of the University of Bern.

In 1984 he undertook a shoulder surgery fellowship with Charles A. Rockwood Jr. at the University of Texas in San Antonio. He subsequently trained in tumor, foot and ankle surgery at Hôpital Cochin and in pediatric orthopedics at Hôpital Trousseau in Paris during 1984 and 1985.

== Academic and clinical career ==
Gerber worked in the Department of Orthopedic Surgery at the University of Bern from 1985 to 1991, where he became a Privatdozent in 1988 and a professor in 1991. He was appointed chairman of the orthopedic department at the cantonal hospital in Fribourg in 1992. In October 1995 he joined the University of Zurich as professor and chairman of the Department of Orthopedics.

He directed Balgrist University Hospital for 22 years, combining clinical practice with research and medical teaching. He stepped down from the hospital leadership at the end of July 2017. After becoming emeritus, Gerber continued clinical and experimental research; by 2026 he was working as a senior consultant at Sonnenhof Hospital in Bern.

Gerber has served as president of the European Society for Surgery of the Shoulder and the Elbow from 1995 to 1998 and was president of the Swiss Society of Orthopedic Surgery and Traumatology from 2010 to 2012. He was international editor of the American volume of The Journal of Bone and Joint Surgery from 2012 to 2014.

== Teaching and mentoring ==
Many of Gerber's publications, particularly in the later part of his career, list him as senior (last) author, with younger colleagues as first authors. A 2026 bibliometric analysis of the Journal of Shoulder and Elbow Surgery ranked him first among the journal's authors by citations received as last author (54 articles). The ResOrtho Foundation, which he founded, was created to support the academic development of residents and junior staff.

== Research ==
Gerber and his colleagues developed new diagnostic and technical methods and designed and validated new surgical interventions. He reported the use of latissimus dorsi tendon transfer for massive rotator cuff tears in 1988, providing a new method of palliation of irreparable posterosuperior tears. A subsequent review by Jean Grimberg and Jean Kany identifies Gerber's report as the first description of this application of the transfer.

In 1991, Gerber and Krushell published a clinical series of sixteen patients with isolated subscapularis tendon rupture. Their report described the lift-off test, a physical examination maneuver used to assess the subscapularis. A later review by Brett Lenart and Jonathan Ticker discusses the series as an important stage in renewed clinical interest in the anterior rotator cuff.

He and his team introduced and validated new operations, such as indirect reduction and internal fixation of lateral clavicle fractures (1991), humeral head allograft reconstruction for locked posterior shoulder dislocation (1996), lesser tuberosity osteotomy as a new anterior approach to shoulder surgery (2005), and scapular correction for posterior humeral escape (SCOPE). A later publication describes the 1991 coracoclavicular screw technique as the introduction of indirect reduction with stand-alone fixation for these fractures, and a 2017 systematic review credits Gerber and colleagues with introducing the lesser tuberosity osteotomy in total shoulder arthroplasty.

His experimental research has examined fatty infiltration of muscle after tendon tear, using a sheep model of chronic rotator cuff tears. In 2009, Gerber and colleagues investigated gradual musculotendinous traction in sheep as a means of reversing muscle changes following tendon retraction.

Based on radiographic and clinical studies, Gerber and his team studied the role of scapular anatomy in the development of rotator cuff tears and osteoarthritis. In 2013 they introduced the critical shoulder angle, a radiographic parameter combining glenoid inclination and lateral extension of the acromion. A later study described scapular morphology in dynamic and static posterior shoulder instability. After retiring from his chair, he and colleagues developed a corrective osteotomy of the scapula to correct posterior shoulder instability, with preliminary results reported in 2024 and 2025. Gerber was senior author of biomechanical studies documenting the role of acromial anatomy in posterior shoulder stability.

According to Google Scholar, Gerber's scientific work has an h-index of 123 and has been cited more than 55,000 times.

== Research institutions and education ==
In 2000, Gerber founded the ResOrtho Foundation to support orthopedic research and education. The foundation funded the Harvard–Balgrist shoulder fellowship and endowed a professorship in muscle biology at the University of Zurich, which was occupied by Martin Flück in 2012.

Gerber was involved in establishing the Balgrist Campus, a musculoskeletal research and development center that opened in Zurich in December 2015. It was founded jointly by the ResOrtho Foundation and the Swiss Balgrist Association. In 2016, the Swiss federal government recognized the campus as a research institution of national importance. Gerber chaired the board of Balgrist Campus AG from 2017 to 2025.

The ResOrtho Foundation also established the Dominik C. Meyer Award, launched in December 2020 in memory of the orthopedic surgeon, researcher and long-time collaborator of Gerber. According to the foundation, the award recognizes paradigm-changing discoveries and innovations in musculoskeletal medicine.

== Awards and honors ==
Gerber and his collaborators received four Charles S. Neer Awards from the American Shoulder and Elbow Surgeons: basic science awards in 1990, 1998 and 2007, and a clinical science award in 1998. In 2007, he received the Kappa Delta (OREF) Orthopaedic Research and Education Foundation Research Award for his work on rotator cuff disease.

He received an Achievement Award from the American Academy of Orthopaedic Surgeons in 2012 and the Orthopaedic Research Society's Arthur Steindler Award in 2014. He is an honorary fellow of the Royal College of Surgeons of Edinburgh and received an honorary doctorate (PhD) from Sapienza University of Rome in 2024. In 2026, the American College of Surgeons conferred honorary fellowship on him.

Gerber was also a coauthor of the papers receiving the Neviaser Basic Science Award in 2025 and 2026. The studies concerned acromial stresses after reverse shoulder arthroplasty and the relationship between acromial anatomy and posterior shoulder stability, respectively.

== Selected publications ==
- Gerber, C.; Vinh, T. S.; Hertel, R.; Hess, C. W. (1988). "Latissimus dorsi transfer for the treatment of massive tears of the rotator cuff. A preliminary report." Clinical Orthopaedics and Related Research, 232, 51–61.
- Gerber, C.; Krushell, R. J. (1991). "Isolated rupture of the tendon of the subscapularis muscle. Clinical features in 16 cases." The Journal of Bone and Joint Surgery British Volume, 73(3), 389–394.
- Ballmer, F. T.; Gerber, C. (1991). "Coracoclavicular screw fixation for unstable fractures of the distal clavicle. A report of five cases." The Journal of Bone and Joint Surgery British Volume, 73(2), 291–294.
- Gerber, C.; Lambert, S. M. (1996). "Allograft reconstruction of segmental defects of the humeral head for the treatment of chronic locked posterior dislocation of the shoulder." The Journal of Bone and Joint Surgery American Volume, 78(3), 376–382.
- Gerber, C.; Yian, E. H.; Pfirrmann, C. A.; Zumstein, M. A.; Werner, C. M. (2005). "Subscapularis muscle function and structure after total shoulder replacement with lesser tuberosity osteotomy and repair." The Journal of Bone and Joint Surgery American Volume, 87(8), 1739–1745.
- Gerber, C.; Meyer, D. C.; Frey, E.; et al. (2009). "Neer Award 2007: Reversion of structural muscle changes caused by chronic rotator cuff tears using continuous musculotendinous traction. An experimental study in sheep." Journal of Shoulder and Elbow Surgery, 18(2), 163–171.
- Gerber, C.; Pennington, S. D.; Nyffeler, R. W. (2009). "Reverse total shoulder arthroplasty." Journal of the American Academy of Orthopaedic Surgeons, 17(5), 284–295.
- Moor, B. K.; Bouaicha, S.; Rothenfluh, D. A.; Sukthankar, A.; Gerber, C. (2013). "Is there an association between the individual anatomy of the scapula and the development of rotator cuff tears or osteoarthritis of the glenohumeral joint? A radiological study of the critical shoulder angle." The Bone & Joint Journal, 95-B(7), 935–941.
- Hochreiter, B.; Nguyen, N.; Calek, A.-K.; Sigrist, B.; Ackland, D. C.; Ernstbrunner, L.; Ek, E. T.; Gerber, C. (2025). "Posterior shoulder stability depends on acromial anatomy: a cadaveric, biomechanical study." Journal of Shoulder and Elbow Surgery, 34(6), 1589–1601.
