= Oblique ridges of scapula =

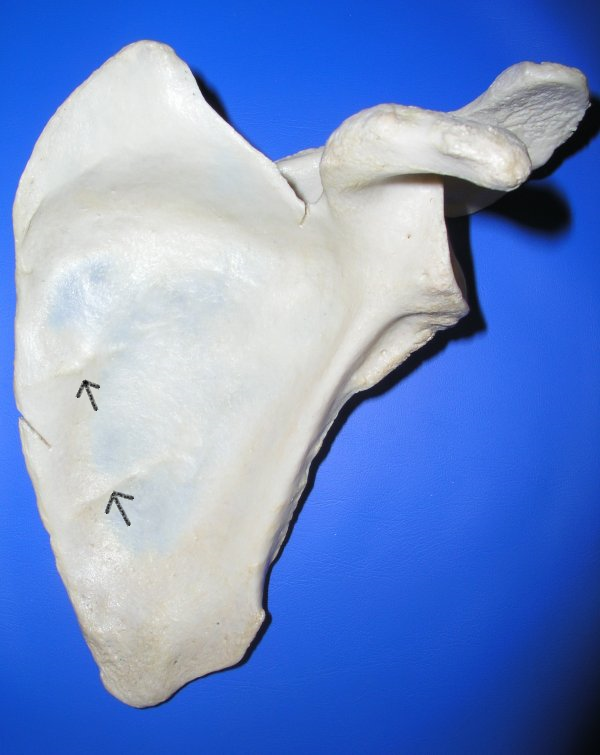
- Costal surface of left scapula. Oblique ridges indicated by black arrows.

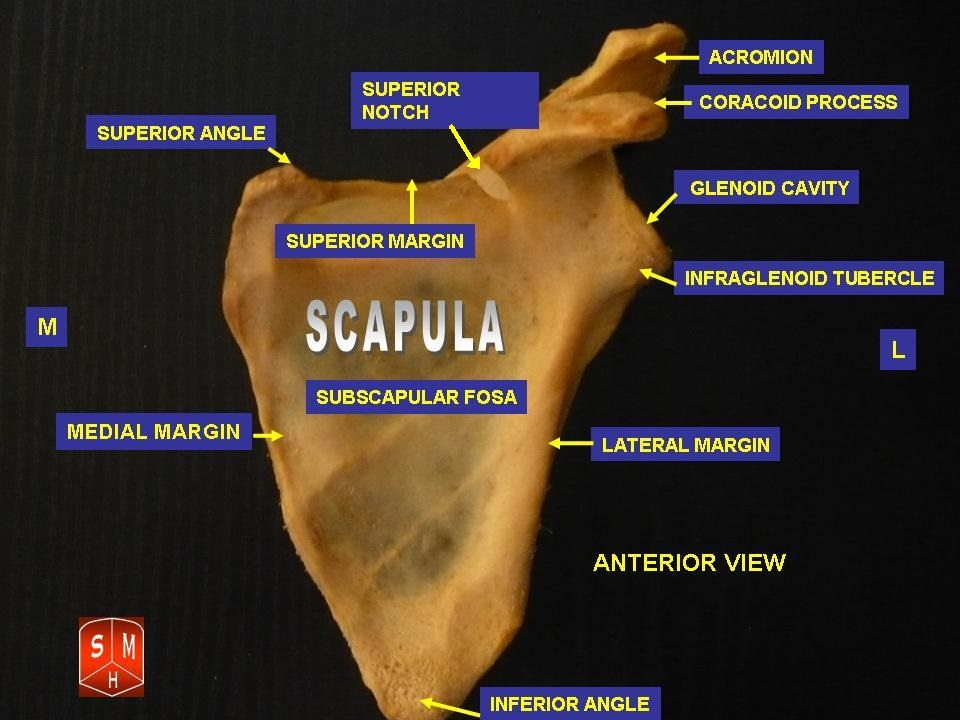
- Costal surface of left scapula. Oblique ridges are not labeled, but visible at the center.

Details

Identifiers
- Latin: lineae musculares scapulae

The oblique ridges cross the subscapular fossa from superomedial to inferiolateral (parallel to scapular spine). These ridges are formed by intramuscular tendons of the subscapularis muscle.

The costal or ventral surface of the scapula presents a broad concavity, the subscapular fossa. The medial two-thirds of the fossa are marked by several oblique ridges, which run lateralward and upward. The ridges give attachment to the tendinous insertions, and the surfaces between them to the fleshy fibers, of the subscapularis muscle.

== Additional images ==
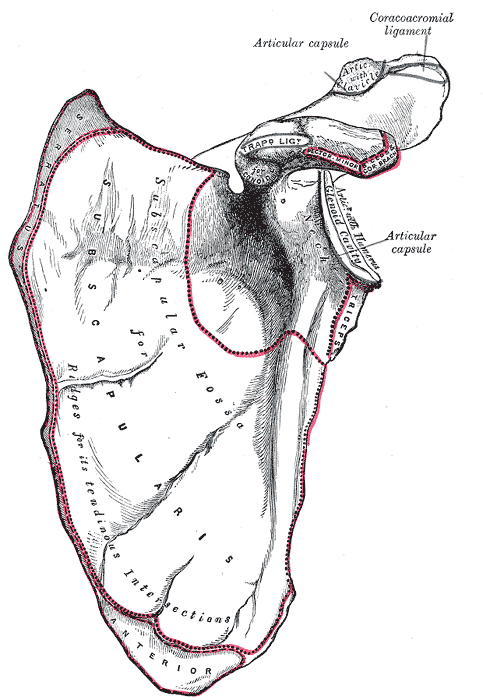
Costal surface of left scapula. Oblique ridges are visible at the center.

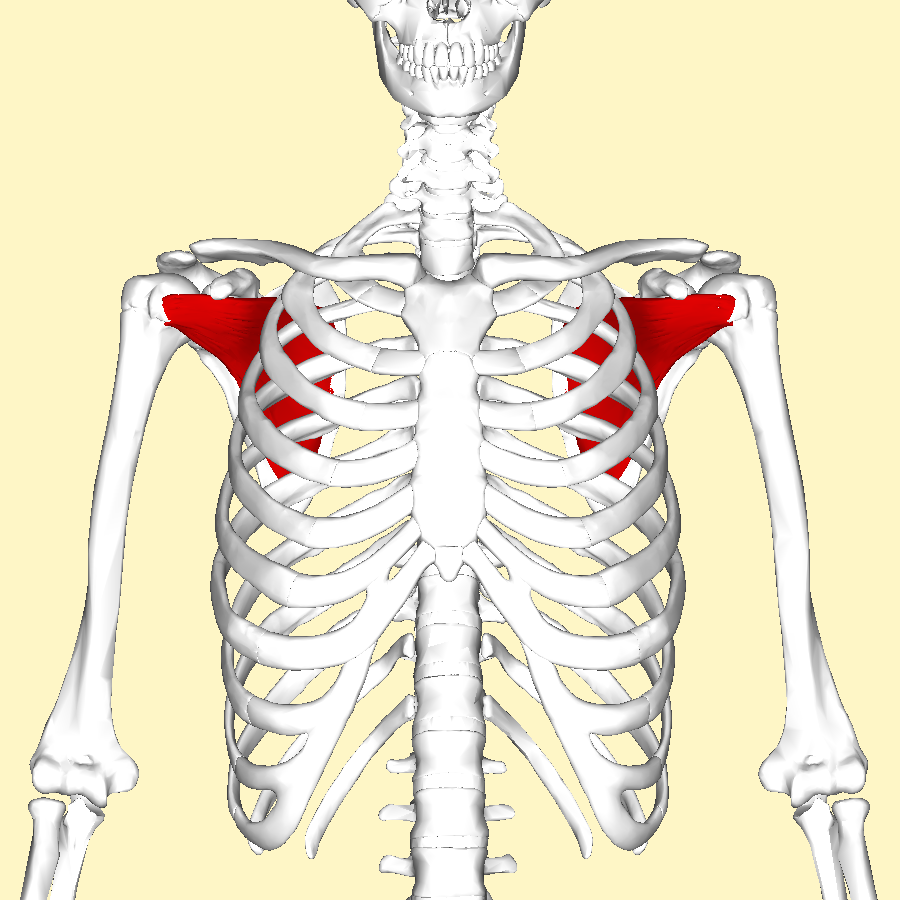
Subscapularis muscle (shown in red).

== See also ==
- Subscapular fossa
- Subscapularis muscle
