= Giovanni Vastarini-Cresi =

Italian anatomost

Giovanni Vastarini-Cresi (1870 – 14 April 1924) was an Italian anatomist and professor at the Naples Anatomical Institute. He is especially known for studies of the human tongue and arterio-venous anastomoses in humans and other animals.

Vastarini-Cresi was born in Taranto. He became a lecturer at the Naples Anatomical Institute where he became a professor and in 1919, the head of the institute. He was involved in teaching and research in histology and anatomy. His major work was on the studies of arteriovenous anastomosis in the tongue of humans. He introduced glycogen-staining techniques.
