= Thoracodorsal artery =

Large blood vessel

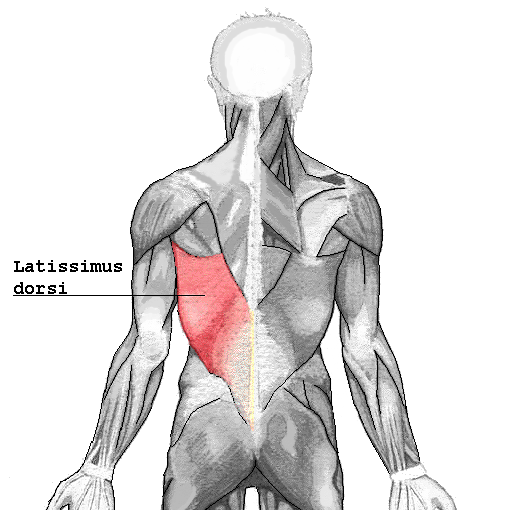
- Latissimus dorsi

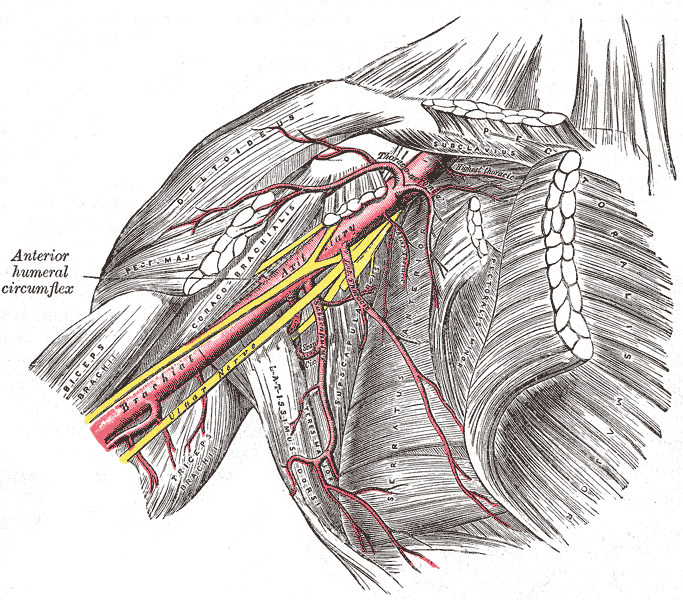
- Axillary artery and its branches - anterior view of right upper limb and thorax.

Details
- Source: Subscapular artery
- Supplies: Latissimus dorsi

Identifiers
- Latin: arteria thoracodorsalis
- TA98: A12.2.09.014
- TA2: 4628
- FMA: 66320

The thoracodorsal artery is a branch of the subscapular artery. It passes inferior-ward upon the surface of the serratus anterior muscle (which it supplies posteroinferiorly to the lateral thoracic artery). It is accompanied by the thoracodorsal nerve along its source. It also supplies the latissimus dorsi.

It forms anastomoses with intercostal arteries.
