= Scapular anastomosis =

Circulatory system around the shoulder blade

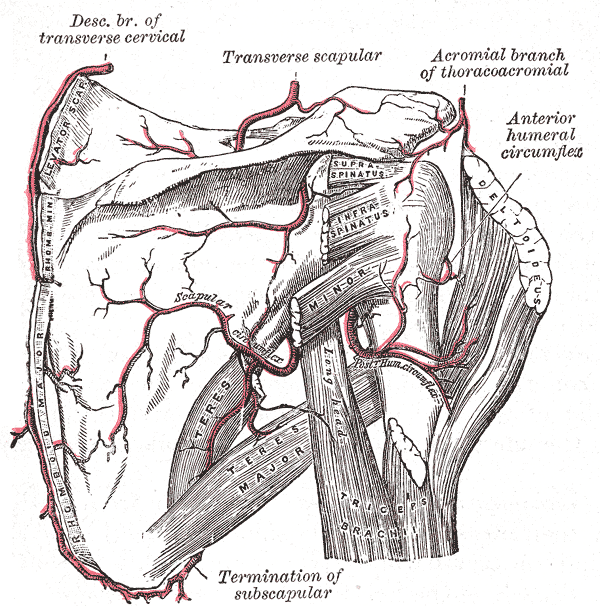
- The scapular and circumflex arteries

The scapular anastomosis is a system connecting certain subclavian artery and their corresponding axillary artery, forming a circulatory anastomosis around the scapula. It allows blood to flow past the joint in case of occlusion, damage, or pinching of the following scapular arteries:

- Transverse cervical artery
- Dorsal scapular artery (the anastomosing branch of the transverse cervical)
- Suprascapular artery
- Branches of subscapular artery
- Branches of thoracic aorta

The transverse cervical artery gives off a branch, the dorsal scapular artery, which accompanies the dorsal scapular nerve and runs down the vertebral border of the scapula to its medial edge and inferior angle. The dorsal scapular artery anastomoses with the subscapular artery, providing an alternate route to the 3rd part of the axillary artery in the event of a slowly forming occlusion.

The suprascapular artery branches off from the thyrocervical trunk, which in turn arises from the first part of the subclavian artery. This suprascapular artery crosses over the suprascapular ligament, passes through the supraspinous fossa and turns around the lateral border of the spine of the scapula and supplies the infraspinous fossa as far as the inferior angle.

The subscapular artery branches from the third part of the axillary and supplies the subscapularis muscle in the subscapular fossa as far as the inferior angle. The subscapular artery gives off a circumflex scapular branch that enters the infraspinous fossa on the dorsal surface of the bone, grooving the axillary border.

All these vessels anastamose or join to connect the first part of the subclavian with the third part of the axillary, providing a collateral circulation. This collateral circulation allows for blood to continue circulating if the subclavian is obstructed.

== See also ==
- Circulatory anastomosis
