= Pullover (exercise) =

Dumbbell or barbell exercise

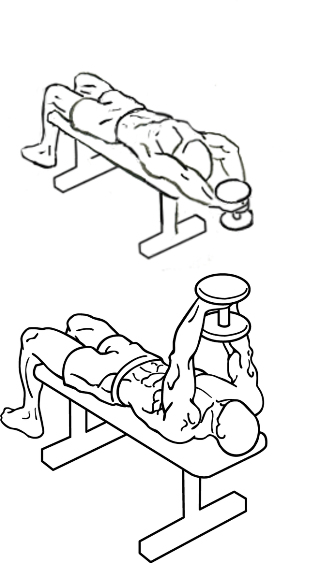

The pullover is an exercise that is performed with either a dumbbell or a barbell. Pullovers can be made to affect either the chest or the back depending on how wide the grip is (barbell) and the position of the shoulders. It targets Pectoralis major, Pectoralis minor, Triceps brachii, Lattismus dorsii and Teres major muscle among other muscles of the chest.

A research done on the pullover movement using a barbell suggested more effect on the pectoralis major muscle as compared to the latissimus dorsi.

== Movement ==
A typical pullover involves resting the upper back on a flat bench. The hips are kept slightly flexed. Keeping the hips off the bench is said to help in balancing the weight and stability during the movement. The weight is held above the chest with elbows slightly bent.

=== Variation ===
This exercise can be done using either a straight barbell, EZ barbell, dumbbell or cable attachment.

The elbows could also be bent at about 90° to achieve a different stretch. In this variation the weight is lowered till the upper arm is in line with the torso. The straight arm variant targets the chest, whereas the bent arm variant targets the upper back and triceps.
