= Vagal trunk =

Vagal trunk may refer to:

- Anterior vagal trunk
- Posterior vagal trunk
