= Circulatory anastomosis =

Connection between blood vessels

A circulatory anastomosis is a connection (an anastomosis) between two blood vessels, such as between arteries (arterio-arterial anastomosis), between veins (veno-venous anastomosis) or between an artery and a vein (arterio-venous anastomosis). Anastomoses between arteries and between veins result in a multitude of arteries and veins, respectively, serving the same volume of tissue. Such anastomoses occur normally in the body in the circulatory system, serving as back-up routes in a collateral circulation that allow blood to flow if one link is blocked or otherwise compromised, but may also occur pathologically.

== Physiologic ==
Arterio-arterial anastomoses have two sub-types: actual, where the arteries meet end to end (e.g., palmar arch, plantar arch); and potential, where arteries meet at terminal arterioles (e.g. coronary arteries and cortical branch of cerebral arteries).

There are many examples of normal arterio-arterial anastomoses in the body. Clinically important examples include:

- Circle of Willis (in the brain)
- Coronary: anterior interventricular artery and posterior interventricular artery of the heart
- Scapular anastomosis (for the subclavian vessels)
- Joint anastomoses: Almost all joints receive anastomotic blood supply from more than one source.
  - Shoulder (and circumflex humeral)
  - Elbow (see blood supply of elbow)
  - Hip (and circumflex iliac; see also cruciate anastomosis)
  - Knee (and genicular arteries; see also patellar network)
  - Ankle
- Abdominal anastomoses
  - Marginal artery of the colon
- Pelvic anastomoses
- Hand - palmar arches: superficial palmar arch and deep palmar arch
- Foot - plantar arch

=== Coronary ===
==== Surgical intervention ====
Coronary anastomoses are a clinically vital subject: the coronary anastomosis is the blood supply to the heart. The coronary arteries are vulnerable to arteriosclerosis and other effects. Inadequate supply to the heart will lead to chest pains (angina) or a heart attack (myocardial infarction). These can be ameliorated by surgical intervention to create a bypass using the anastomosis technique. Creation of an end-to-end anastomosis is a basic microsurgical skill that is taught to surgical residents and fellows.

==== Naturally occurring ====
Coronary anastomoses are anatomically present though functionally obsolete. There was some suggestion that they may be helpful if a problem develops slowly over time (this will need to be verified) but in the case of the pathogenesis of CHD they do not provide a sufficient blood flow to prevent infarction.

There are anastomoses between the Circumflex and right coronary arteries and between the anterior and posterior inter-ventricular arteries. In the normal heart these anastomoses are non-functional.

=== Arterio-venous ===
Superficial arterio-venous anastomoses open when the body reaches a high temperature, and enable the body to cool itself. As warm arterial blood passes close to the surface it will decrease in temperature. This occurs together with sweating.

== Pathologic ==
Pathological circulatory anastomoses result from trauma or disease and may involve veins, or arteries. These are usually referred to as fistulas. In the cases of veins or arteries, traumatic fistulas usually occur between artery and vein. Portacaval anastomosis, by contrast, is a veno-venous anastomosis between a vein of the portal circulation and a vein of the systemic circulation, which allows blood to bypass the liver in patients with portal hypertension, often resulting in hemorrhoids, esophageal varices, or caput medusae.

Circulatory anastomoses between monochorionic twins may result in twin-to-twin transfusion syndrome.
