= Lateral root of median nerve =

- Brachial plexus

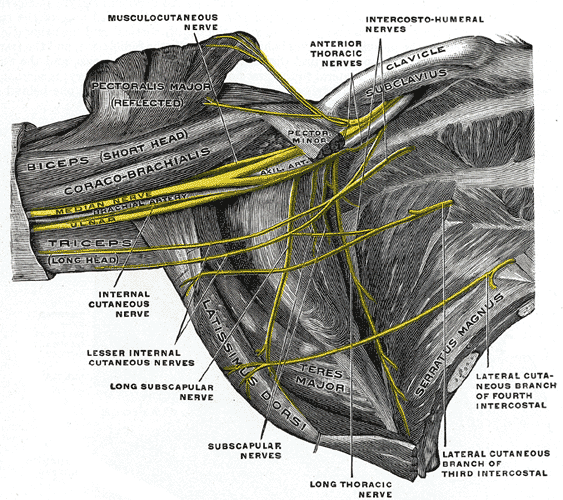
- The right brachial plexus (infraclavicular portion) in the axillary fossa; viewed from below and in front.

Details

Identifiers
- Latin: radix lateralis nervi mediani
- TA98: A14.2.03.033
- TA2: 6424
- FMA: 65244

The lateral root of median nerve is a source of the median nerve, originating off the lateral cord of the brachial plexus. It is typically one of two nerve roots forming the median nerve, the other being the medial root, although anatomical variations in which the median nerve instead has three or four nerve roots have been described in medical literature.
