= Posterior cord =

Part of the brachial plexus

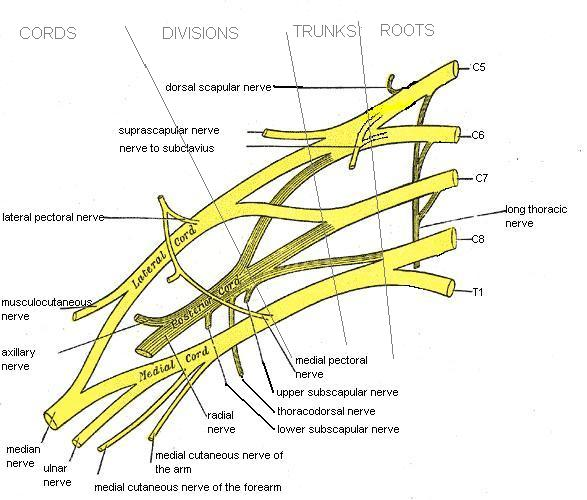
- Plan of brachial plexus. (Posterior cord is shaded gray.)

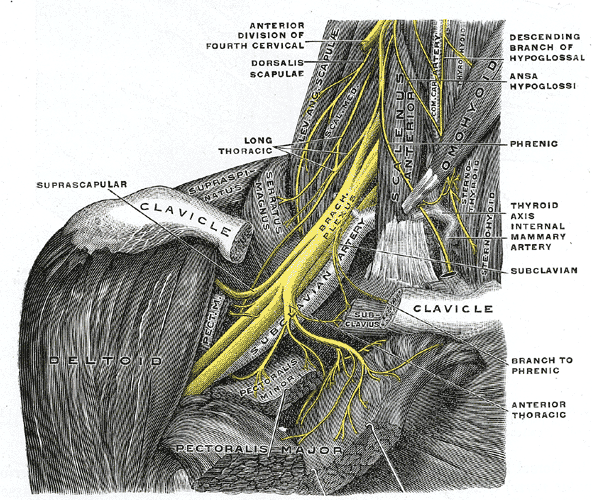
- The right brachial plexus with its short branches, viewed from in front. The sternomastoid and trapezius muscles have been completely removed, the omohyoid and subclavius have been partially removed; a piece has been sawed out of the clavicle; the pectoralis muscles have been incised and reflected.

Details
- From: Brachial plexus - posterior divisions of the three trunks
- To: Subscapular, up. and low. thoracodorsal axillary radial
- Innervates: None

Identifiers
- Latin: fasciculus posterior plexus brachialis
- TA98: A14.2.03.023
- TA2: 6416
- FMA: 45237

The posterior cord is a part of the brachial plexus. It consists of contributions from all of the roots of the brachial plexus.

The posterior cord gives rise to the following nerves:

Name	Roots	Supplies
upper subscapular nerve	C5-C6	subscapularis muscle of the rotator cuff
lower subscapular nerve	C5-C6	subscapularis muscle, teres major muscle
thoracodorsal nerve	C6-C8	latissimus dorsi muscle
axillary nerve	C5-C6	sensation to the shoulder and motor to the deltoid muscle and the teres minor
radial nerve	C5-C8, T1	triceps brachii muscle, the brachioradialis muscle, the extensor muscles of the fingers and wrist (extensor carpi radialis muscle), supinator, and the extensor and abductor muscles of the thumb

== Additional images ==
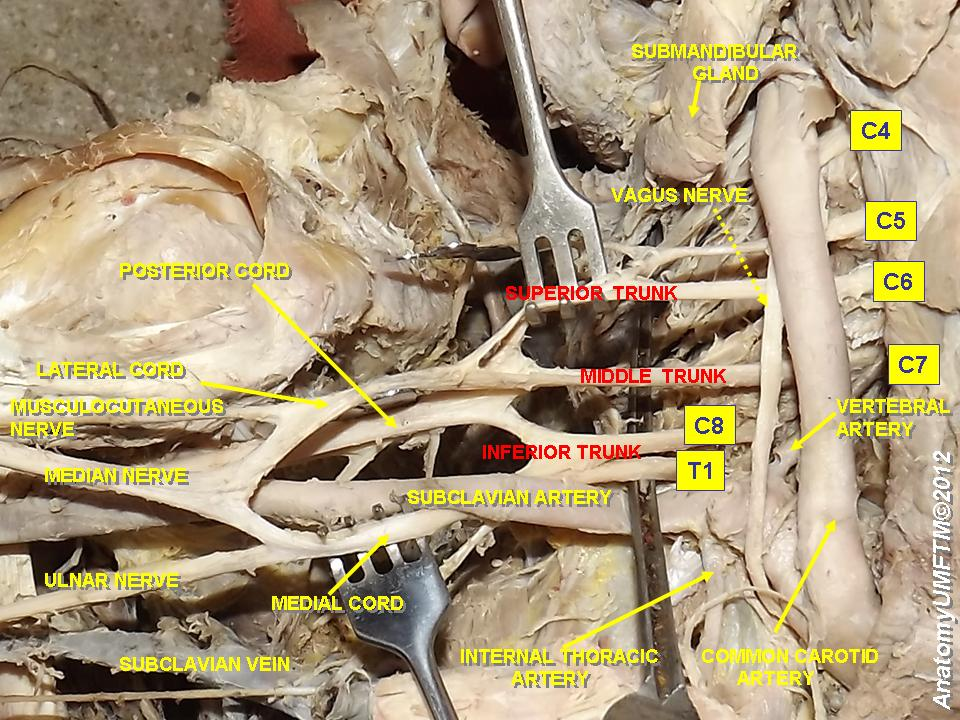
Brachial plexus

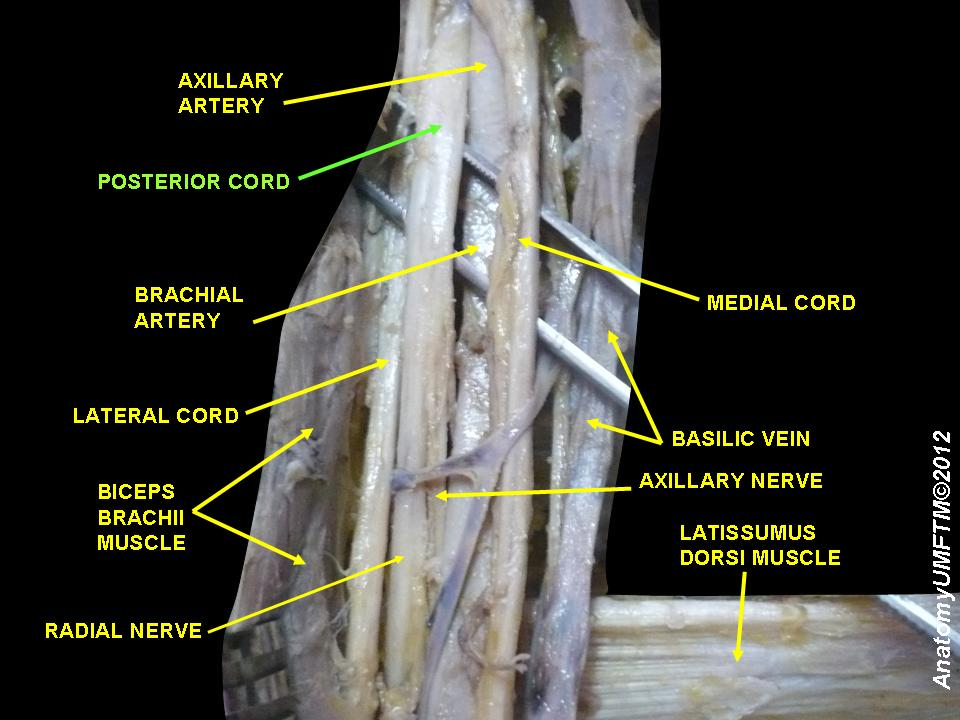
Posterior cord

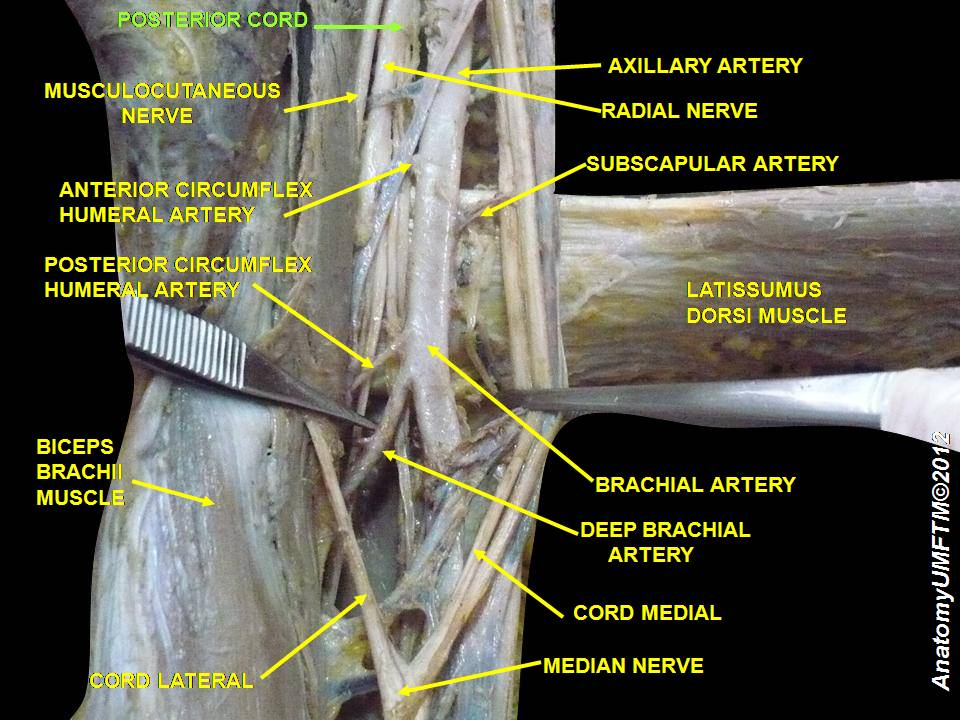
Posterior cord

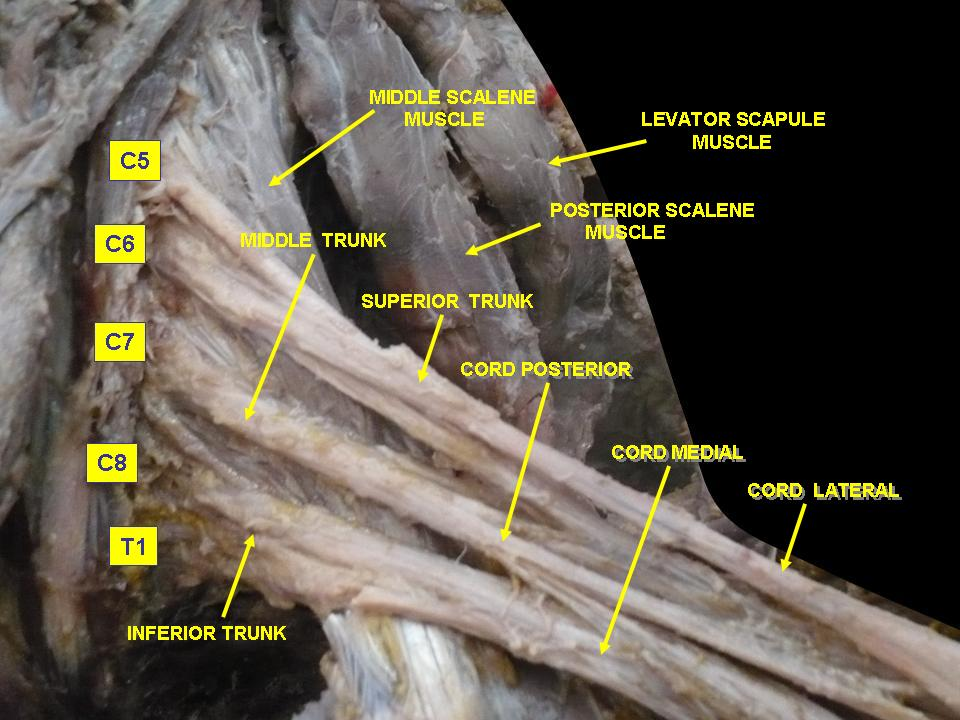
Brachial plexus. Deep dissection.

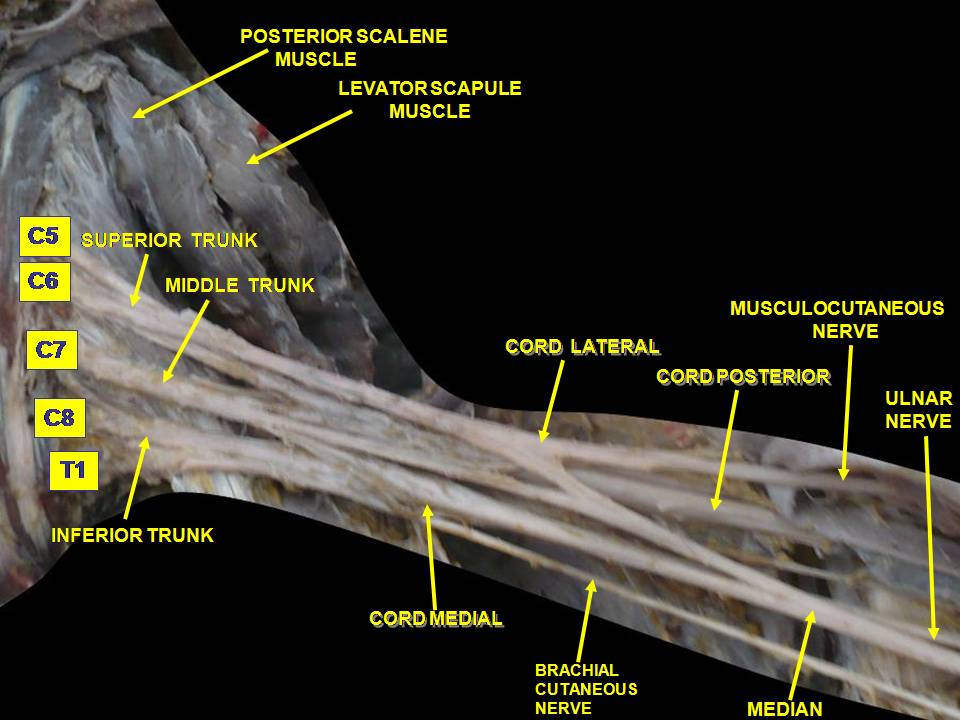
Brachial plexus. Deep dissection. Anterolateral view
