= Thoracodorsal nerve =

Nerve that supplies the latissimus dorsi

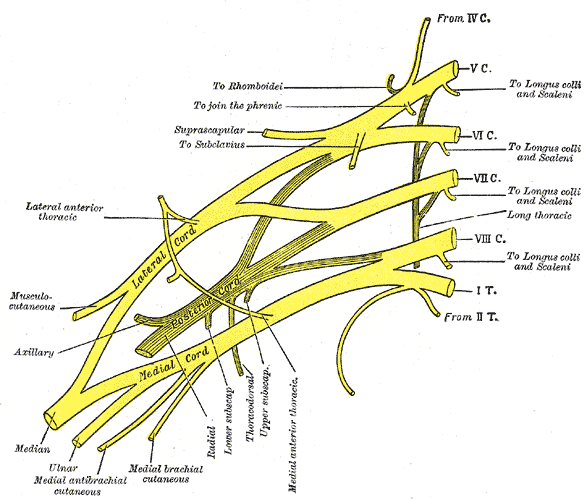
- Plan of brachial plexus. (Label for thoracodorsal nerve at bottom center.)

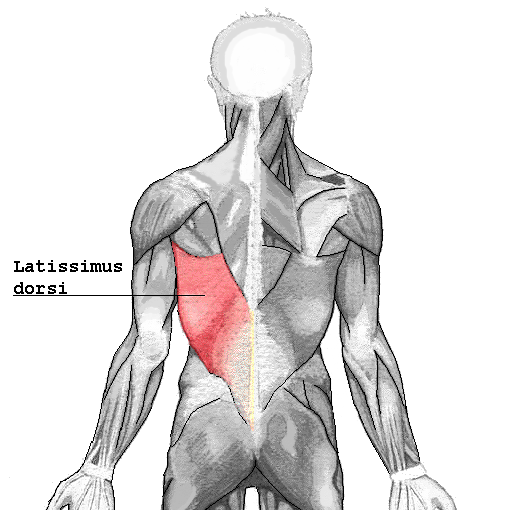
- Latissimus dorsi

Details
- From: Posterior cord (C6-C8)
- Innervates: Latissimus dorsi muscle

Identifiers
- Latin: nervus thoracodorsalis
- TA98: A14.2.03.016
- TA2: 6430
- FMA: 65290

The thoracodorsal nerve is a nerve present in humans and other animals, also known as the middle subscapular nerve or the long subscapular nerve. It supplies the latissimus dorsi muscle.

== Anatomy ==
=== Origin ===
The thoracodorsal nerve arises from the posterior cord of the brachial plexus. It is derived from their ventral rami (in spite of the fact that the latissimus dorsi is found in the back) of cervical nerves C6-C8. It is derived from fibres of the posterior divisions of all three trunks of the brachial plexus.

=== Course ===
It passes inferior-ward anterior to the subscapularis muscle and subscapular vessels. It penetrates into the substance of the latissimus dorsi muscle near the lateral border of scapula.

It follows the course of the subscapular artery, along the posterior wall of the axilla to the latissimus dorsi muscle, in which it may be traced as far as the lower border of the muscle.

=== Distribution ===
The thoracodorsal nerve innervates the latissimus dorsi muscle on its deep surface.

== Clinical significance ==
The latissimus dorsi is occasionally used for transplantation, and for augmentation of systole in cardiac failure. In these cases, the nerve supply is preserved, and transplanted with the muscle (for example, with facial reanimation).

Posterior cord lesions can result in the loss of adduction of the shoulder joint, as innervation to latissimus dorsi is lost.

== Additional images ==
Brachial plexus

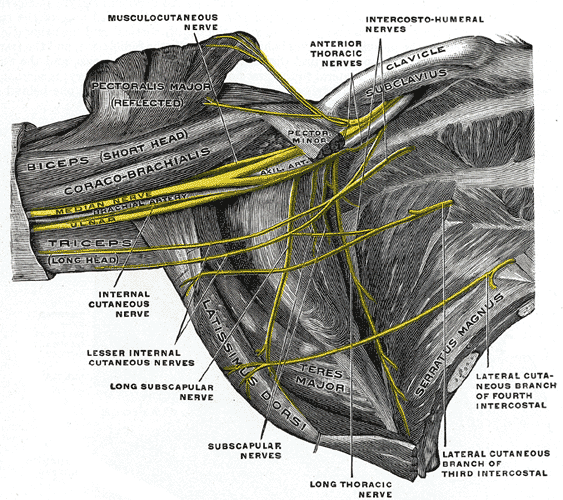
The right brachial plexus (infraclavicular portion) in the axillary fossa; viewed from below and in front.

Brachial plexus with courses of spinal nerves shown
