= Subscapular artery =

Large blood vessel

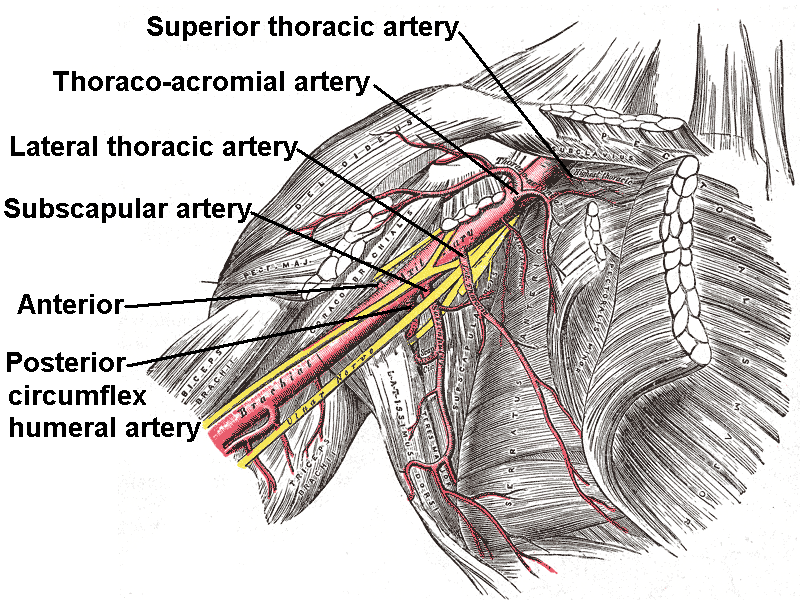
- Axillary artery and its branches, including subscapular artery - anterior view of right upper limb and thorax.

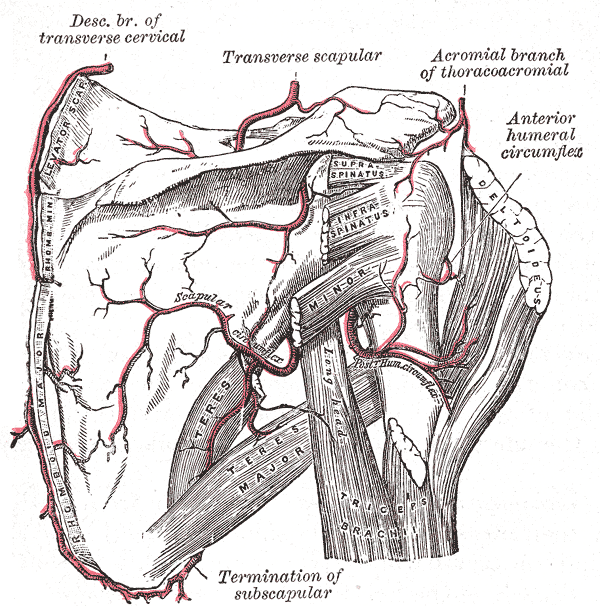
- The scapular and circumflex arteries.

Details
- Source: Axillary artery
- Branches: Circumflex scapular artery, thoracodorsal artery
- Supplies: Latissimus dorsi

Identifiers
- Latin: arteria subscapularis
- TA98: A12.2.09.013
- TA2: 4627
- FMA: 22677

The subscapular artery, the largest branch of the axillary artery, arises from the third part of the axillary artery at the lower border of the subscapularis muscle, which it follows to the inferior angle of the scapula, where it anastomoses with the lateral thoracic and intercostal arteries, and with the descending branch of the dorsal scapular artery (a.k.a. deep branch of the transverse cervical artery if it arises from the cervical trunk), and ends in the neighboring muscles.

About 4 cm from its origin it gives off two branches, first the scapular circumflex artery and then the thoracodorsal artery.

From the thoracodorsal artery, it supplies latissimus dorsi, while the scapular circumflex artery participates in the scapular anastamosis. It terminates in an anastomosis with the dorsal scapular artery.

== Additional images ==
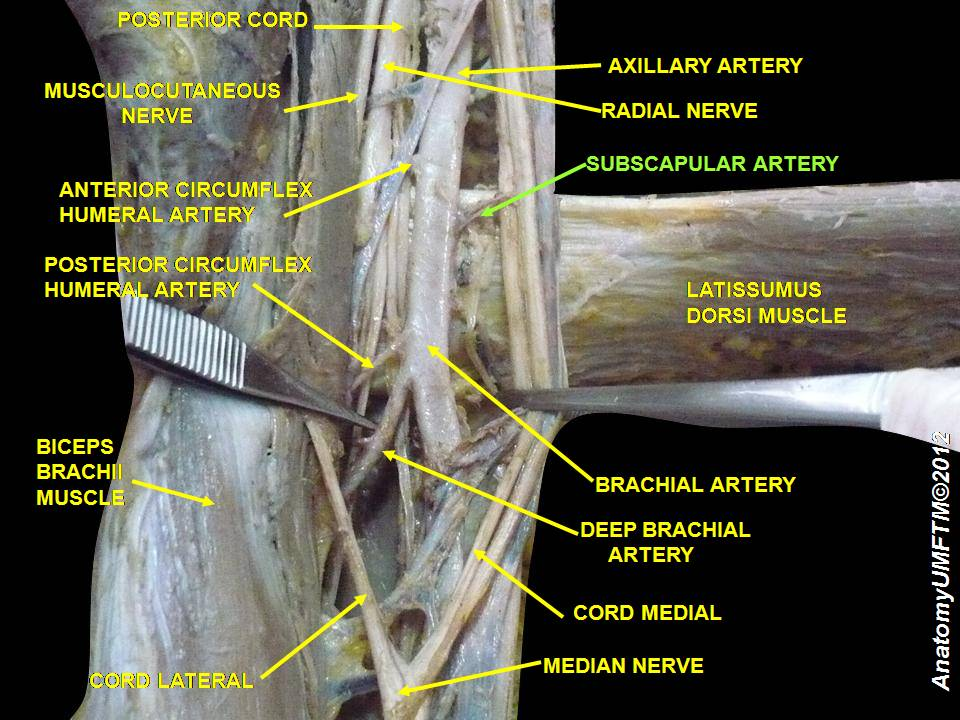
Subscapular artery
