= Upper subscapular nerve =

Nerve of upper limb

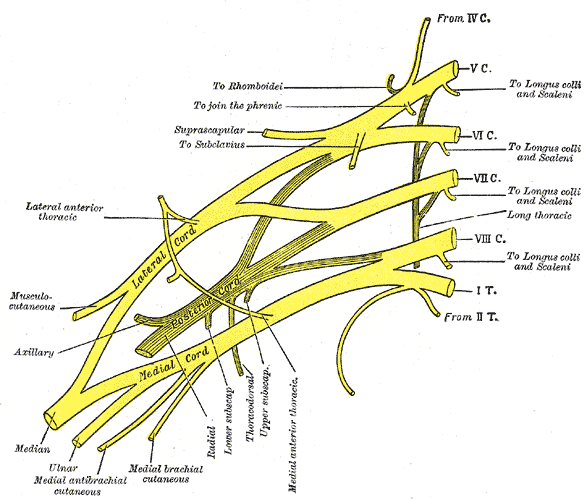
- Plan of brachial plexus. (Label for upper subscapular nerve at bottom center.)

Details
- From: Posterior cord
- Innervates: Subscapularis

Identifiers
- Latin: nervus subscapularis superior
- TA2: 6428
- FMA: 65304

The upper (superior) subscapular nerve is the first branch of the posterior cord of the brachial plexus. The upper subscapular nerve contains axons from the ventral rami of the C5 and C6 cervical spinal nerves. It innervates the superior portion of the subscapularis muscle. The inferior portion of the subscapularis is innervated by the lower subscapular nerve.

== Structure ==
The axons which form the upper subscapular nerve travel from the ventral rami of C5 and C6. They join at the upper trunk and move through its posterior division to form the posterior cord, along with the other two posterior divisions of the middle and lower trunks. The axons then branch from the posterior cord and form the upper subscapular nerve.

== Function ==
The upper subscapular nerve innervates the superior portion of the subscapularis muscle.

== Clinical significance ==
A lesion to the upper subscapular nerve can cause a reduced ability to medially rotate at the shoulder joint, however this function is supplemented by other muscles.

== Additional images ==
Brachial plexus

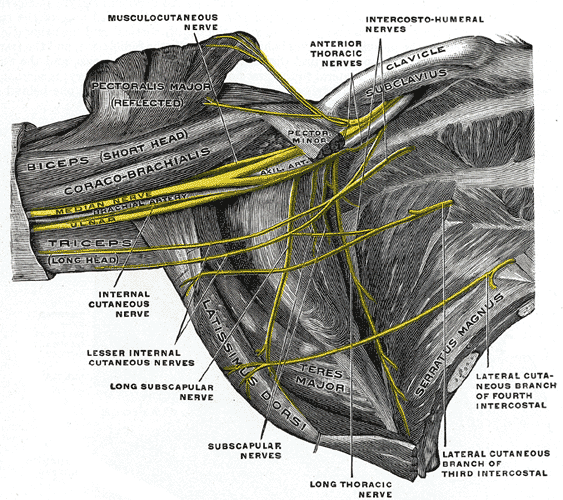
The right brachial plexus (infraclavicular portion) in the axillary fossa; viewed from below and in front.
