= Medial root of median nerve =

- Brachial plexus

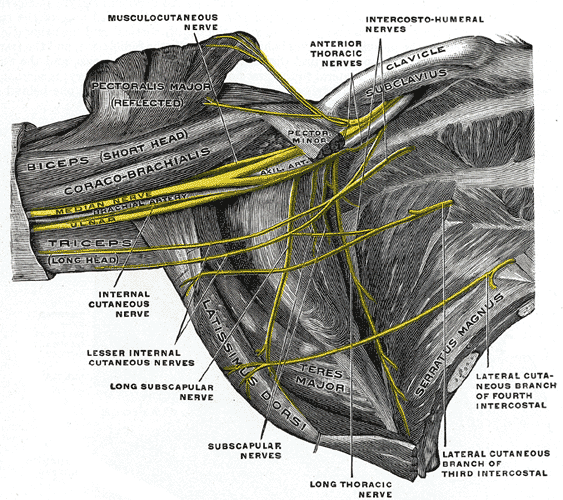
- The right brachial plexus (infraclavicular portion) in the axillary fossa; viewed from below and in front.

Details

Identifiers
- Latin: radix medialis nervi mediani
- TA98: A14.2.03.032
- TA2: 6458
- FMA: 65243

The medial root of median nerve is one of the two sources of the median nerve, the other being the lateral root of median nerve. The brachial plexus demonstrates a wide range of anatomical variations, many of which carry significant implications for clinical practice. Conventionally, the median nerve arises from two roots: a lateral root from the lateral cord and a medial root from the medial cord. During the routine dissection of a 72-year-old female cadaver, an unusual bilateral but asymmetric anomaly was observed. On the left side, the median nerve was formed by three roots, while on the right, it was formed by four roots. In both axillae, the variant roots united anterior to the third part of the axillary artery. No additional plexus abnormalities were present. The coexistence of triple and quadruple roots in the same individual is exceptionally rare. These variations may complicate axillary surgeries, reduce the reliability of brachial plexus blocks, and predispose to unexpected neurological deficits. Recognition of such anomalies is essential for surgeons, anesthesiologists, neurologists, and anatomists.
