= Latissimus dorsi muscle =

Large, flat back muscle

Latissimus dorsi
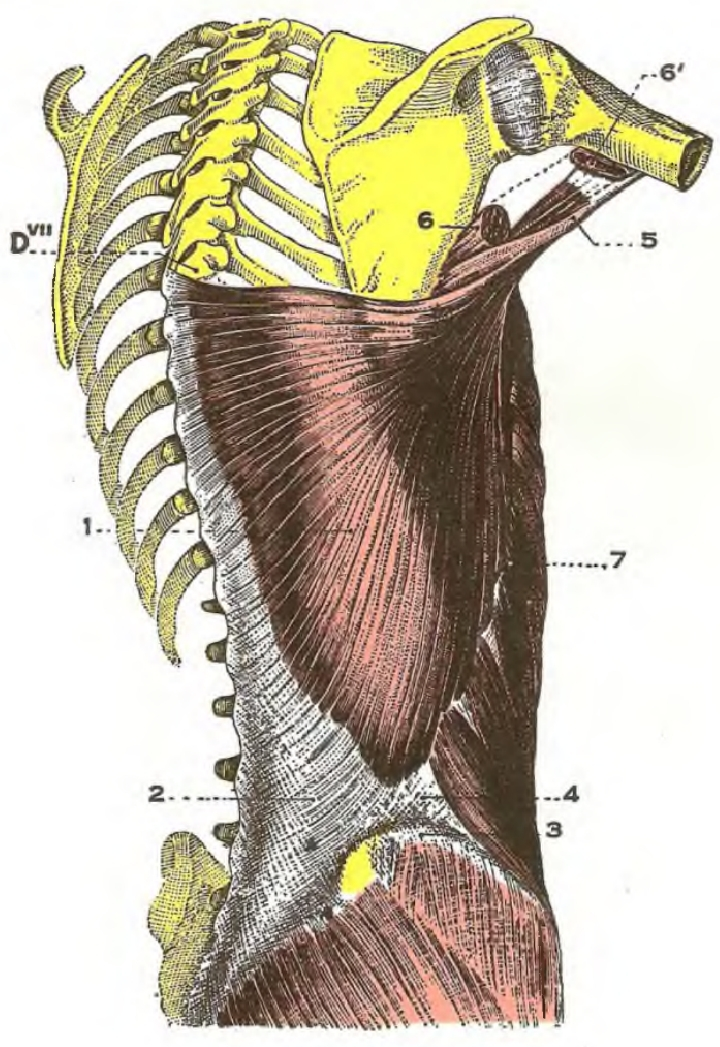
- Latissimus dorsi. DVII, seventh thoracic vertebra. — 1, Latissimus. — 2, Thoracolumbar fascia. — 3, Iliac crest. — 4, Petit's triangle. — 5, Insertion tendon of latissimus (check out its torsion). — 6, 6', Teres major interrupted at its middle. — 7, External oblique muscle. (After Testut's Anatomy.)

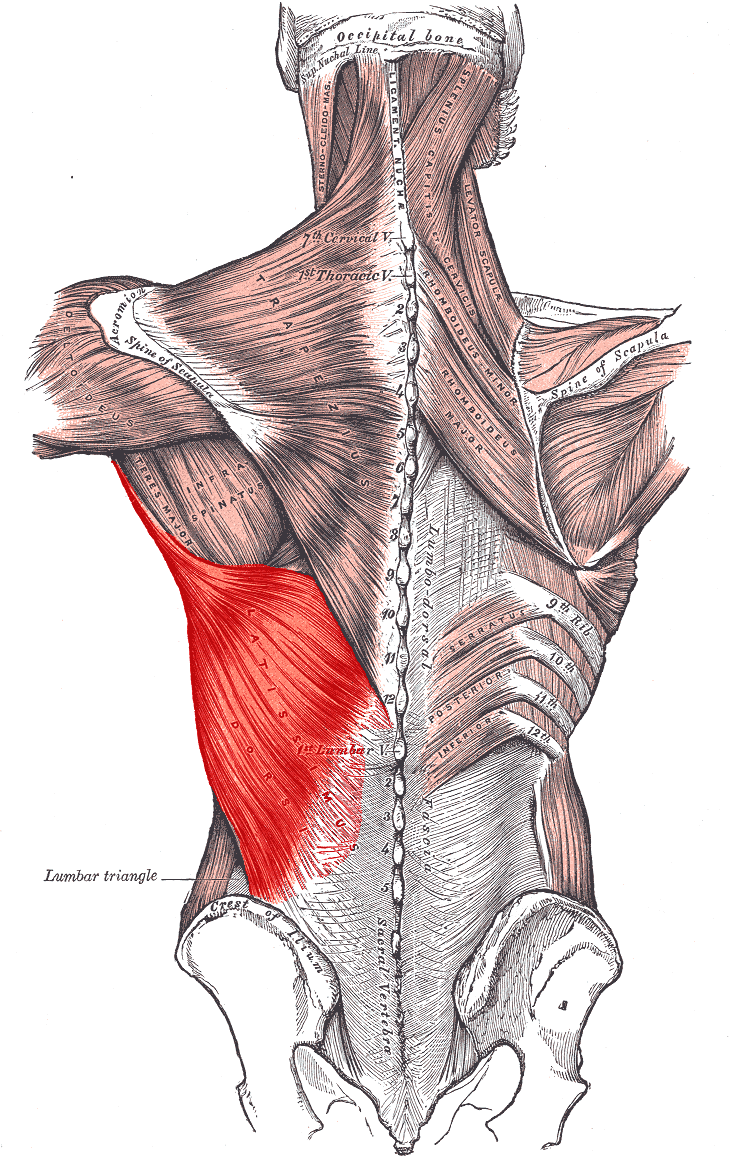
- Muscles connecting the upper extremity to the vertebral column. Left-sided latissimus is shown in bright red.

Details
- Origin: Spinous processes of vertebrae T7-S5, thoracolumbar fascia, iliac crest, inferior 4 ribs and inferior angle of scapula
- Insertion: Floor of intertubercular groove of the humerus
- Artery: Thoracodorsal branch of the subscapular artery
- Nerve: Thoracodorsal nerve (C6, C7, C8)
- Actions: Adducts, extends and internally rotates the arm when the insertion is moved towards the origin. When observing the muscle action of the origin towards the insertion, the lats are a very powerful rotator of the trunk.
- Antagonist: Deltoid and trapezius muscle

Identifiers
- Latin: musculus latissimus dorsi
- TA98: A04.3.01.006
- TA2: 2231
- FMA: 13357

The latissimus dorsi (/ləˈtɪsɪməs ˈdɔːrsaɪ/), also known simply as latissimus, is a large, flat muscle on the back that stretches to the sides, behind the arm, and is partly covered by the trapezius on the back near the midline.

The word latissimus dorsi (plural: latissimi dorsi) comes from Latin and means "broadest [muscle] of the back", from "latissimus" (Latin: broadest) and "dorsum" (Latin: back). The pair of muscles are commonly known as "lats", especially among bodybuilders.

The latissimus dorsi is responsible for extension, adduction, transverse extension also known as horizontal abduction (or horizontal extension), flexion from an extended position, and (medial) internal rotation of the shoulder joint. It also has a synergistic role in extension and lateral flexion of the lumbar spine.

Due to bypassing the scapulothoracic joints and attaching directly to the spine, the actions the latissimi dorsi have on moving the arms can also influence the movement of the scapulae, such as their downward rotation during a pull up.

== Structure ==
The latissimus is a large fan-shaped muscle which covers a wide area of the back, being broad at its (medial) origin, narrow at its (lateral) insertion. It originates from the spinous processes of the six lower thoracic vertebrae (deep to the trapezius), and, through the thoracolumbar fascia, the spinous processes of the lumbar and sacral, and the posterior third of the outer lip of the iliac crest, and the last four ribs (interdigitating with external oblique muscle). Its fibers pass upward and laterally over the lower angle of the scapula, from which an extra slip is typically added to the muscle. Its upper fibers are nearly horizontal, middle, oblique, and lower, vertical: it then wraps around the lower border of the teres major and is inserted, ventrally to that muscle, by a tendon 1.5 inches wide into the floor of the intertubercular sulcus (sin. bicipital groove) of the humerus, a little higher than the teres major. A synovial bursa lies between the tendons of insertion of the latissimus and teres major.

=== Variations ===
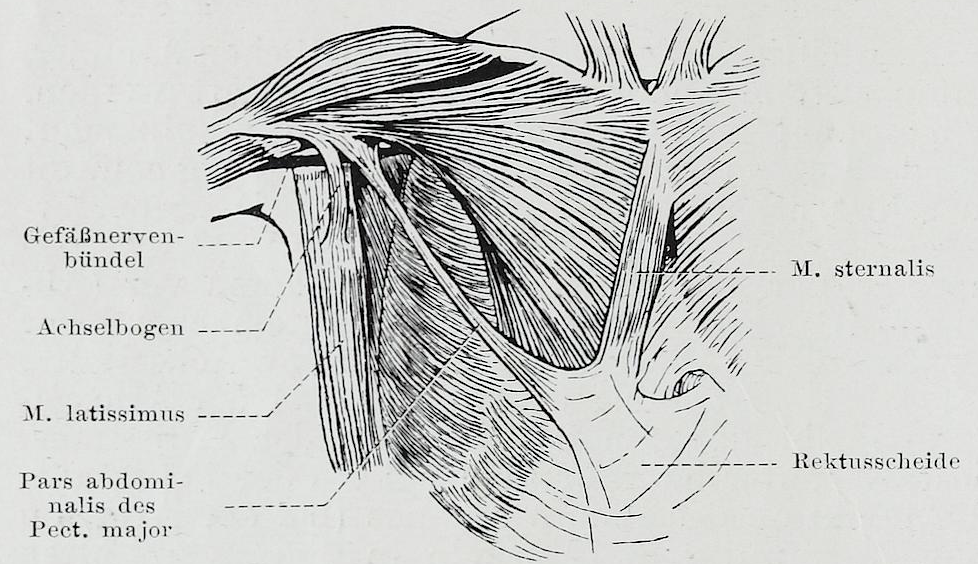
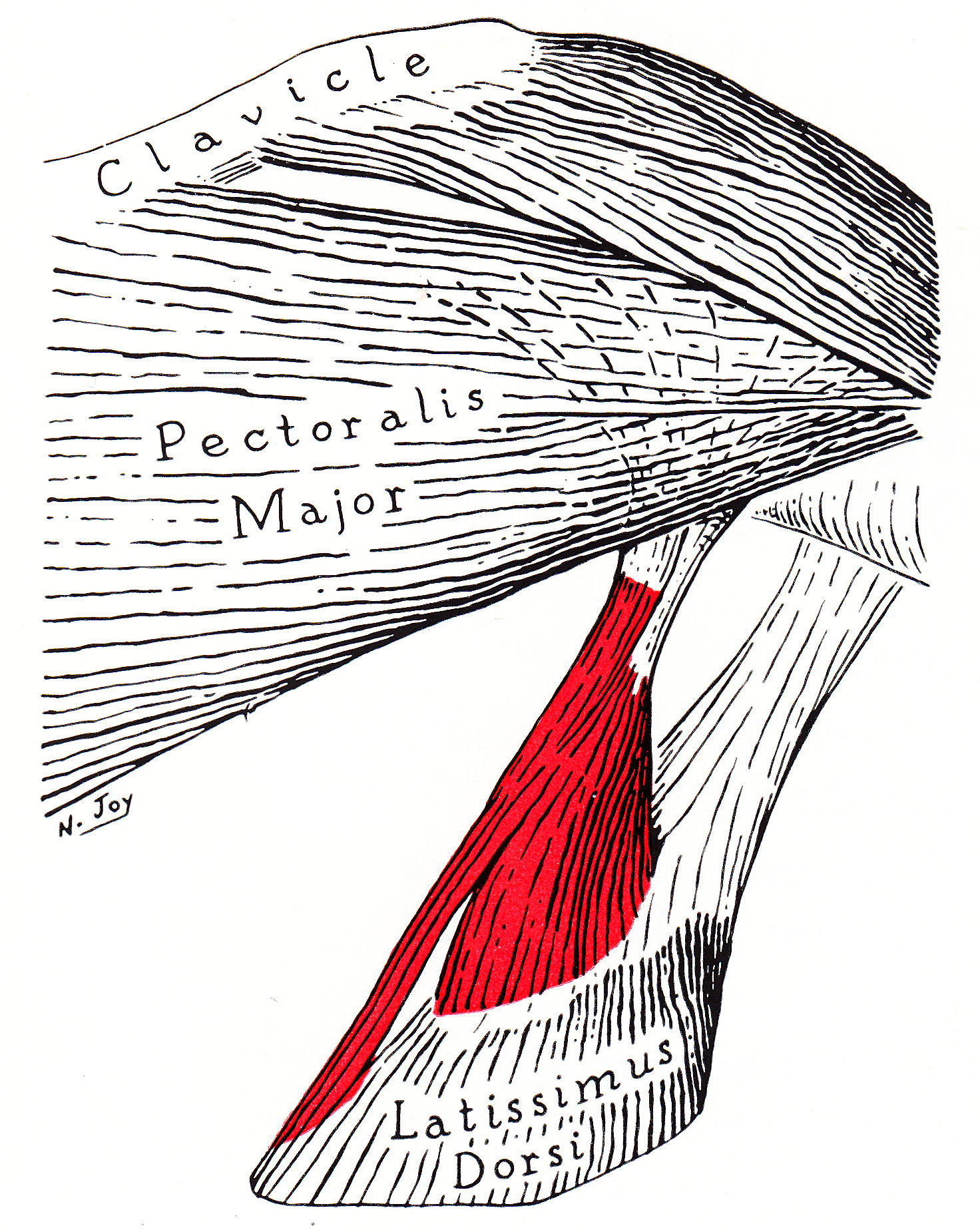
Axillary arches shown from two different angles.

The number of dorsal vertebrae, to which it is attached, varies from four to eight; the number of costal attachments varies; muscle fibers may or may not reach the crest of the ilium.

A muscle slip, the axillary arch, varying from 7 to 10 cm in length, and from 5 to 15 mm in breadth, occasionally springs from the upper edge of the latissimus dorsi about the middle of the posterior fold of the axilla, and crosses the axilla in front of the axillary vessels and nerves, to join the under surface of the tendon of the pectoralis major, the coracobrachialis, or the fascia over the biceps brachii. This axillary arch crosses the axillary artery, just above the spot usually selected for the application of a ligature, and may mislead a surgeon. It is present in about 7% of the population and may be easily recognized by the transverse direction of its fibers. Guy et al. extensively described this muscular variant using MRI data and positively correlated its presence with symptoms of neurological impingement.

A fibrous slip usually passes from the upper border of the tendon of the Latissimus dorsi, near its insertion, to the long head of the triceps brachii. This is occasionally muscular, and is the representative of the dorsoepitrochlearis brachii of apes. This muscular form is found in ~5% of humans and is sometimes termed the latissimocondyloideus.

The latissimus dorsi crosses the inferior angle of the scapula. A study found that, of 100 cadavers dissected:

- 43% had "a substantial amount" of fibers in the latissimus dorsi originating from the scapula.
- 36% had few or no muscular fibers, but a "soft fibrous link" between the scapula and the latissimus dorsi
- 21% had little or no connecting tissue between the two structures.

=== Triangles ===
- The lateral margin of the latissimus dorsi is separated below from the obliquus externus abdominis by a small triangular interval, the lumbar triangle of Petit, the base of which is formed by the iliac crest, and its floor by the obliquus internus abdominis.
- Another triangle is situated behind the scapula. It is bounded above by the trapezius, below by the latissimus dorsi, and laterally by the vertebral border of the scapula; the floor is partly formed by the rhomboideus major. If the scapula is drawn forward by folding the arms across the chest, and the trunk bent forward, parts of the sixth and seventh ribs and the interspace between them become subcutaneous and available for auscultation. The space is therefore known as the triangle of auscultation.
- The latissimus dorsi can be remembered best for insertion as "A Miss Between Two Majors". As the latissimus dorsi inserts into the floor of the intertubercular groove of the humerus it is surrounded by two major muscles. The teres major inserts medially on the medial lip of the intertubercular groove and the pectoralis major inserts laterally onto the lateral lip.

=== Nerve supply ===
The latissimus dorsi is innervated by the sixth, seventh, and eighth cervical nerves through the thoracodorsal (long subscapular) nerve. Electromyography suggests that it consists of six groups of muscle fibres that can be independently coordinated by the central nervous system.

== Function ==
The latissimus dorsi assists in depression of the arm with the teres major and pectoralis major. It adducts, extends, and internally rotates the shoulder. When the arms are in a fixed overhead position, the latissimus dorsi pulls the trunk upward and forward.

It has a synergistic role in extension (posterior fibers) and lateral flexion (anterior fibers) of the lumbar spine, and assists as a muscle of both forced expiration (anterior fibers) and an accessory muscle of inspiration (posterior fibers).

Most latissimus dorsi exercises concurrently recruit the teres major, posterior fibres of the deltoid, long head of the triceps brachii, among numerous other stabilizing muscles. Compound exercises for the 'lats' typically involve elbow flexion and tend to recruit the biceps brachii, brachialis, and brachioradialis for this function. Depending on the line of pull, the trapezius muscles can be recruited as well; horizontal pulling motions such as rows recruit both latissimus dorsi and trapezius heavily.

=== Training ===
The power/size/strength of this muscle can be trained with a variety of different exercises. Some of these include:

- Vertical pulling movements such as pull-downs and pull-ups (including chin-ups)
- Shoulder extension movements with straight arms such as straight-arm lat pulldowns and pull-overs
- Deadlift

== Clinical significance ==
Tight latissimus dorsi has been shown to be a contributor to chronic shoulder pain and chronic back pain. Because the latissimus dorsi connects the spine to the humerus, tightness in this muscle can manifest as either sub-optimal glenohumeral joint (shoulder) function which leads to chronic pain or tendinitis in the tendinous fasciae connecting the latissimus dorsi to the thoracic and lumbar spine.

The latissimus dorsi is a potential source of muscle for breast reconstruction surgery after mastectomy (e.g., Mannu flap) or to correct pectoral hypoplastic defects such as Poland's syndrome. An absent or hypoplastic latissimus dorsi can be one of the associated symptoms of Poland's syndrome.

=== Cardiac support ===
For heart patients with low cardiac output and who are not candidates for cardiac transplantation, a procedure called cardiomyoplasty may support the failing heart. This procedure involves wrapping the latissimus dorsi muscles around the heart and electrostimulating them in synchrony with ventricular systole.

=== Injury ===
Injuries to the latissimus dorsi are a rare occurrence in sports. They occur disproportionately in baseball pitchers. Diagnosis can be achieved by visualization of the muscle and movement testing. MRI of the shoulder girdle will confirm the diagnosis. Muscle belly injuries are treated with rehabilitation while tendon avulsion injuries can be treated surgically, or with rehab. Regardless of treatment, patients tend to return to play without any functional losses.

== Additional images ==
Position of the latissimus dorsi muscle (shown in red). Animation.

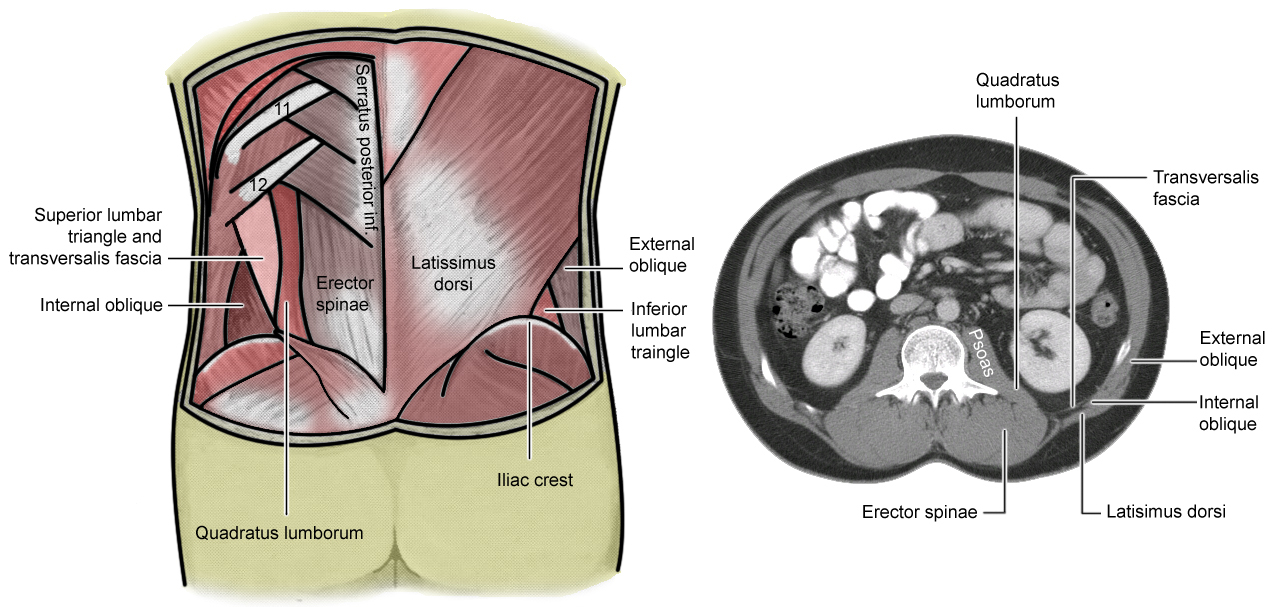
Lumbar triangle

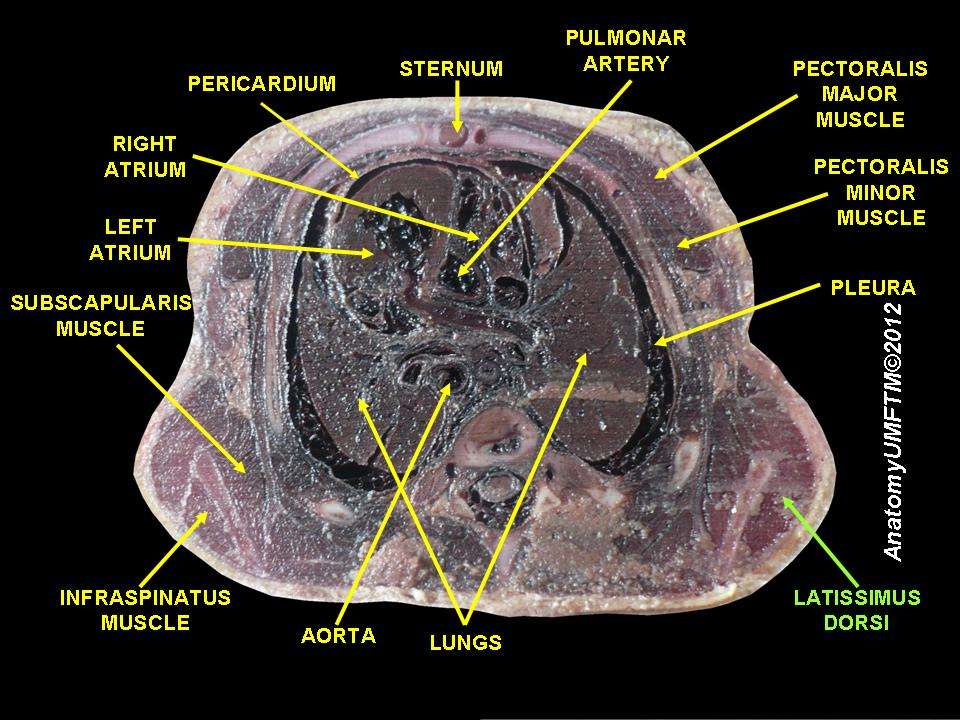
Latissimus dorsi

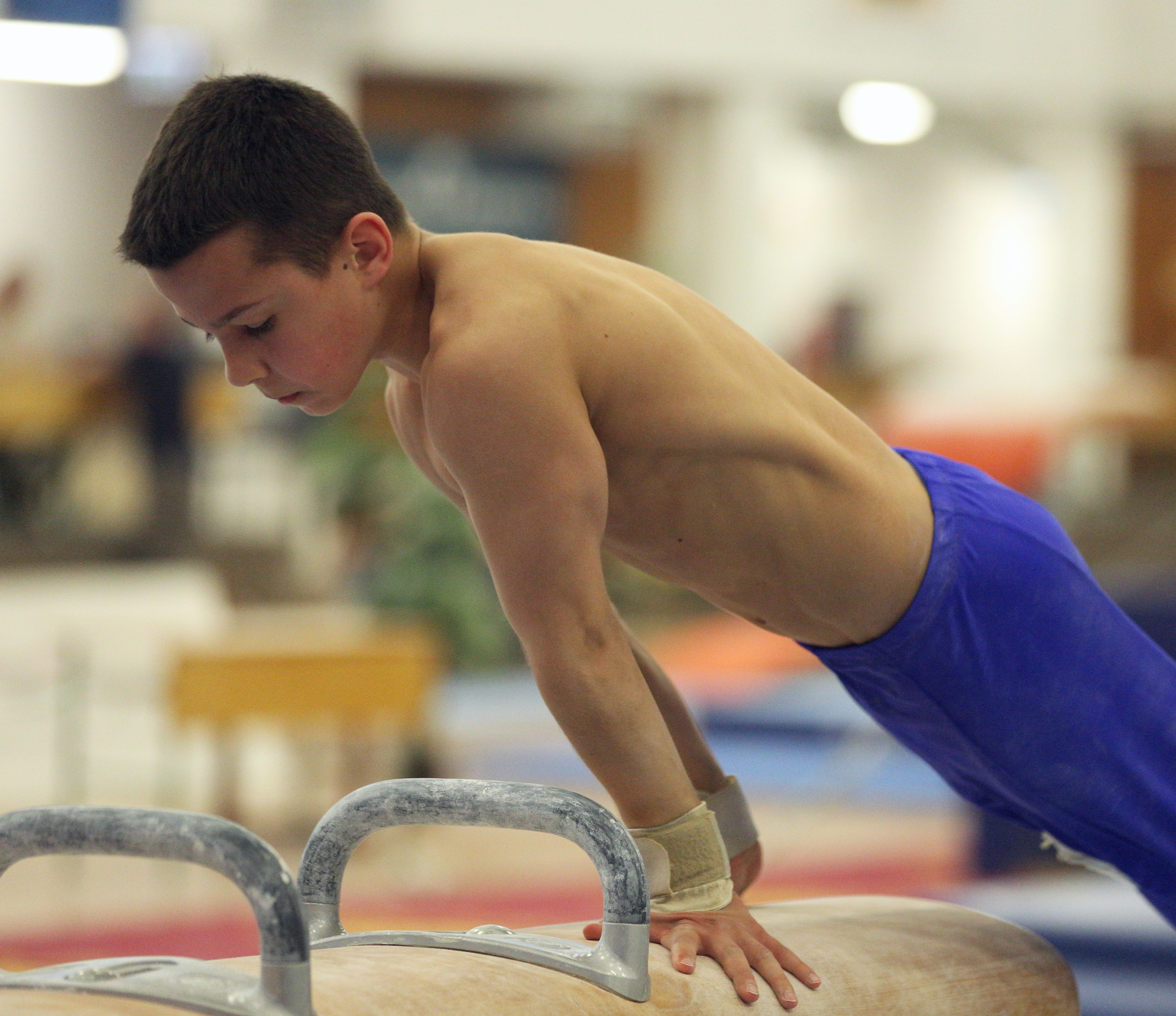
Clearly visible latissimus dorsi muscle of an artistic gymnast on pommel horse.

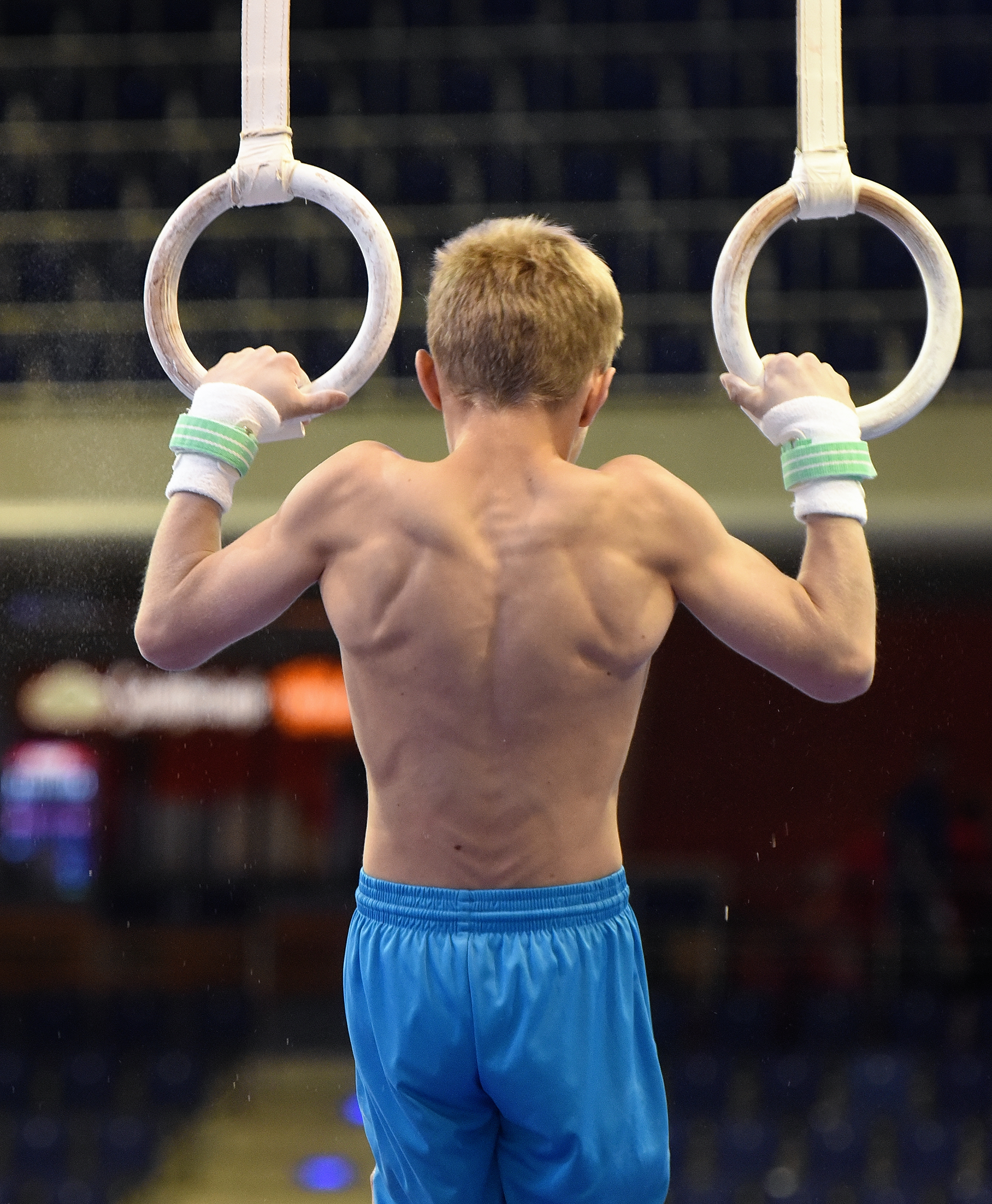
Contraction of the latissimus dorsi muscle of another artistic gymnast on still rings.

== See also ==
- Muscle energy techniques
