= Lower subscapular nerve =

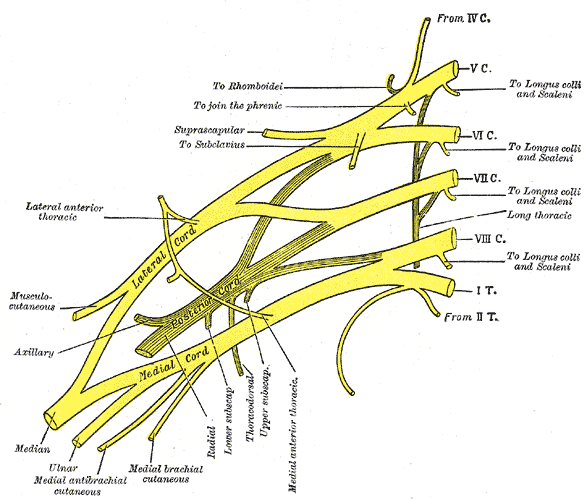
- Diagram of brachial plexus (label for lower subscapular nerve at bottom center)

Details
- From: Posterior cord
- Innervates: Subscapularis and teres major muscle

Identifiers
- Latin: nervus subscapularis inferior
- TA2: 6429
- FMA: 65307

The lower subscapular nerve, also known as the inferior subscapular nerve, is the third branch of the posterior cord of the brachial plexus. It innervates the inferior portion of the subscapularis muscle and the teres major muscle.

== Structure ==
The lower subscapular nerve contains axons from the ventral rami of the C5 and C6 cervical spinal nerves. It is the third branch of the posterior cord of the brachial plexus. It gives branches to 2 muscles:

- subscapularis muscle. It usually gives 4 branches to innervate the subscapularis, and can give up to 8 branches.
- teres major muscle.

== Function ==
The lower subscapular nerve innervates the subscapularis muscle and the teres major muscle. These muscles medially rotate and adduct the humerus.

== Additional images ==
Brachial plexus

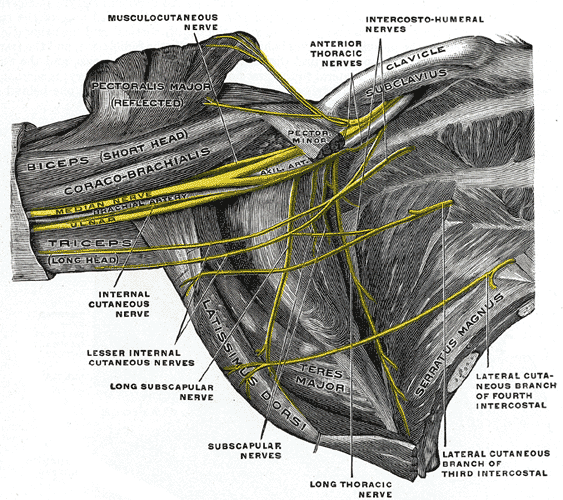
The right brachial plexus (infraclavicular portion) in the axillary fossa; viewed from below and in front.

Brachial plexus with courses of spinal nerves shown
