= Cutaneous innervation of the upper limbs =

Nerve supply to the skin of the upper limbs

Cutaneous innervation of the upper limbs is the nerve supply to areas of the skin of the upper limbs (including the arm, forearm, and hand) which are supplied by specific cutaneous nerves.

Modern texts are in agreement about which areas of the skin are served by which cutaneous nerves, but there are minor variations in some of the details. The borders designated by the diagrams in the 1918 edition of Gray's Anatomy, provided below, are similar but not identical to those generally accepted today.

== Arm and shoulder ==
- Supraclavicular nerves (yellow)
- Axillary nerve (blue). Also Superior lateral cutaneous nerve of arm.
- Inferior lateral cutaneous nerve of arm - Near blue "axillary" area, but actually branches from radial nerve. Most modern sources distinguish the superior and inferior, but some still include a single "lateral brachial cutaneous nerve". )
- Intercostobrachial nerve (brown)
- Medial cutaneous nerve of arm (yellow) - labeled as "medial brachial cutaneous".
- Posterior cutaneous nerve of arm (pink) - not explicitly distinguished from that of Posterior cutaneous nerve of forearm on diagram, but is often distinguished in modern terminology

== Forearm ==
- Lateral cutaneous nerve of forearm (brown) - labeled as "lat. antebrach. cut.". Branch of musculocutaneous nerve.
- Medial cutaneous nerve of forearm (green) - labeled as "medial antebrach. cutaneous". Branch of medial cord.
- Posterior cutaneous nerve of forearm (pink) - labeled as "dorsal antebrach. cut." Branch of radial nerve.

== Hand ==
- Superficial branch of the radial nerve (pink) - dorsal digital branch
- Median nerve (yellow)- palmar digital branch
- Superficial branch of ulnar nerve (blue) - palmar digital branch
