= Cutaneous nerve =

A cutaneous nerve is a nerve that provides nerve supply to the skin.

== Human anatomy ==
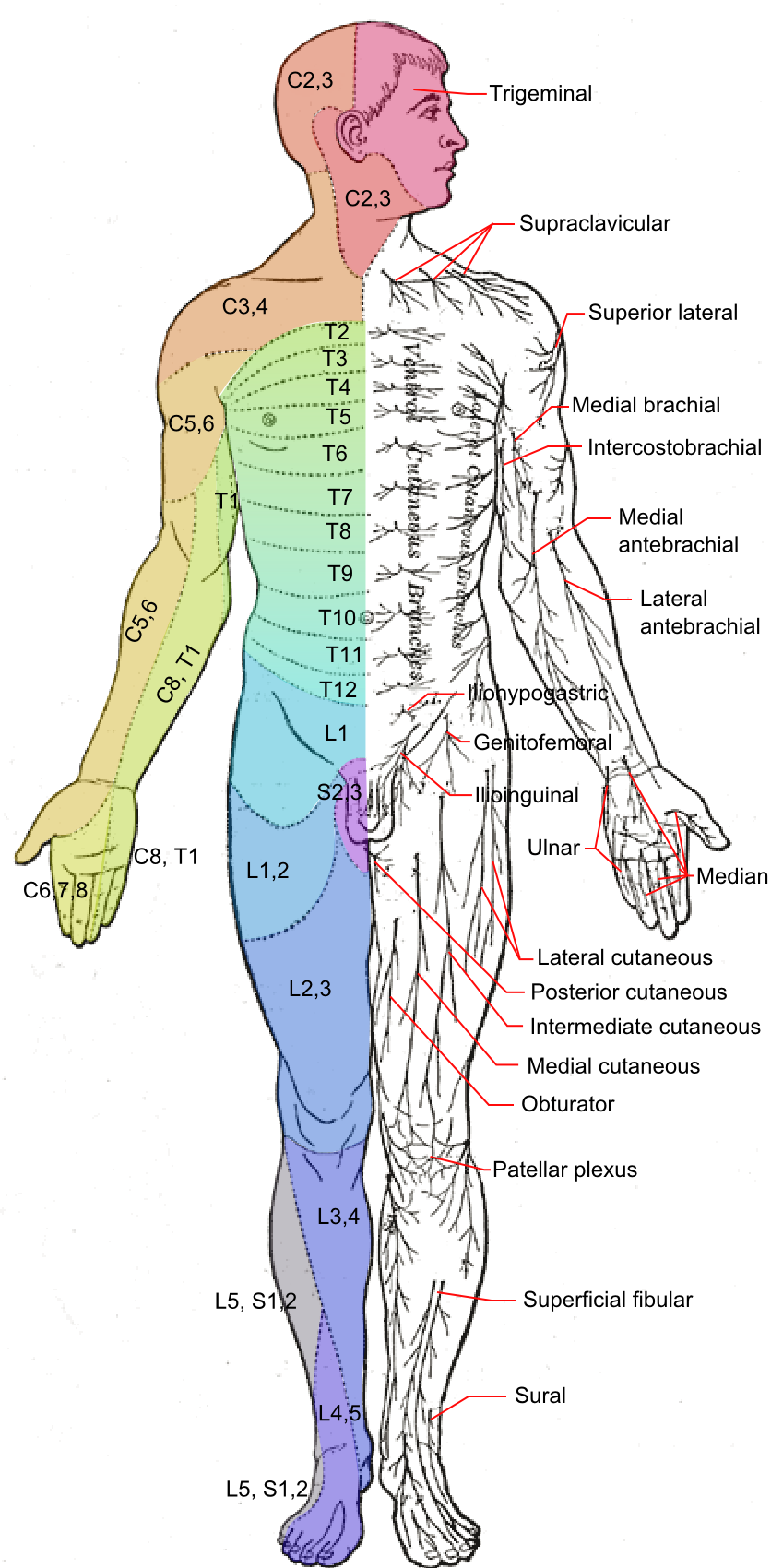

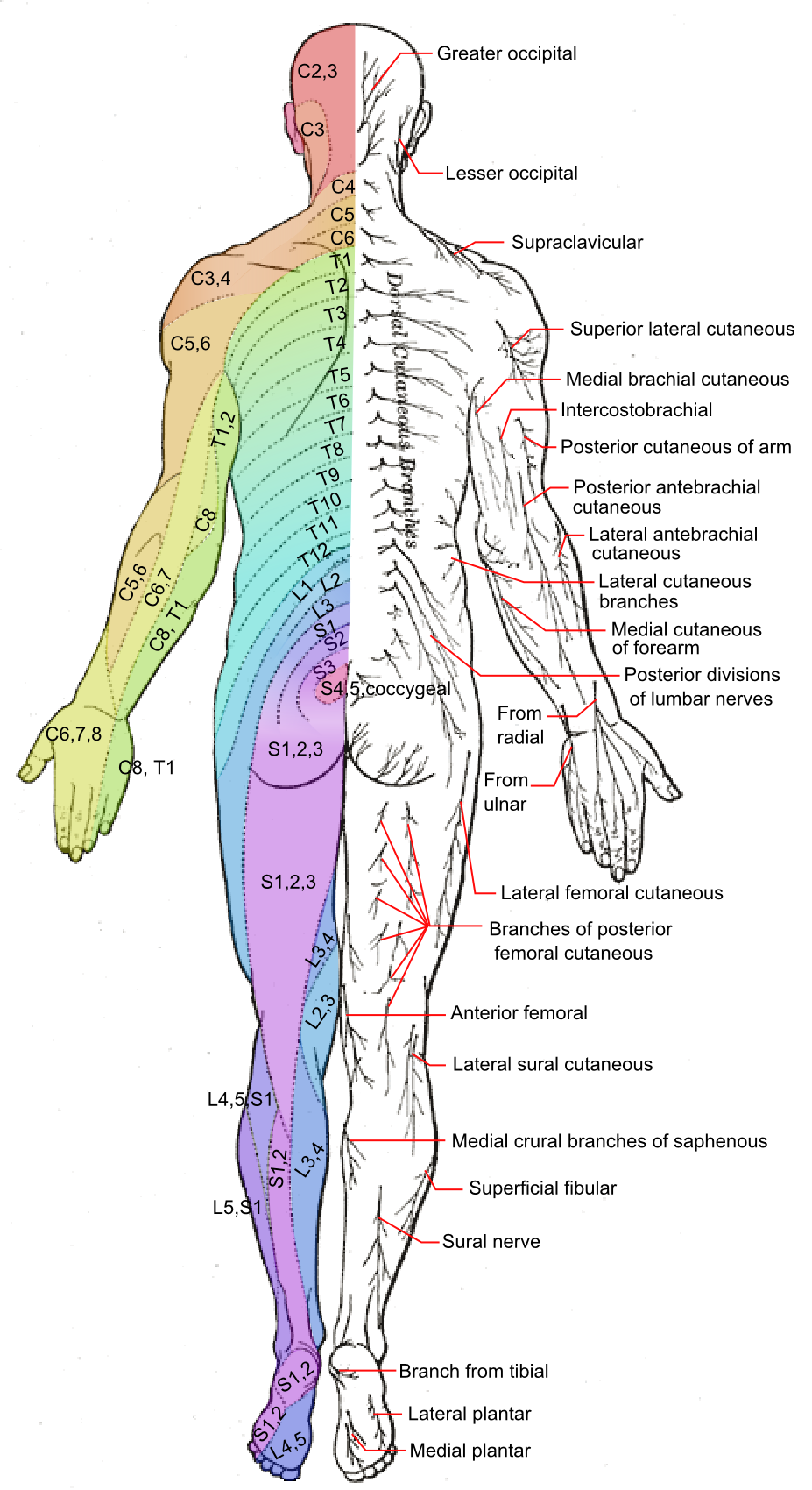

Dermatomes and major cutaneous nerves.

In human anatomy, cutaneous nerves are primarily responsible for providing cutaneous innervation, sensory innervation to the skin. In addition to sympathetic and autonomic afferent (sensory) fibers, most cutaneous nerves also contain sympathetic efferent (visceromotor) fibers, which innervate cutaneous blood vessels, sweat glands, and the arrector pilli muscles of hair follicles. These structures are important to the sympathetic nervous response.

There are many cutaneous nerves in the human body, only some of which are named. Some of the larger cutaneous nerves are as follows:

== Upper body ==
- In the arm (proper)
  - Superior lateral cutaneous nerve of arm (Superior LCNOA)
  - Inferior lateral cutaneous nerve of arm (Inferior LCNOA)
  - Posterior cutaneous nerve of arm (PCNOA)
  - Medial cutaneous nerve of arm (MCNOA)
- In the forearm
  - Lateral cutaneous nerve of forearm (LCNOF)
  - Posterior cutaneous nerve of forearm (PCNOF)
  - Medial cutaneous nerve of forearm (MCNOF)

== Lower body ==
- In the thigh
  - Lateral cutaneous nerve of thigh (LCNOT)
  - Posterior cutaneous nerve of thigh (PCNOT)

== Other ==
- In the torso
  - Ventral cutaneous branches
  - Lateral cutaneous branches
  - Dorsal cutaneous branches
- In the neck and head:
  - Supraorbital nerve
  - Infraorbital nerve
  - Mental nerve
  - Buccal nerve
  - Auriculotemporal nerve
  - Supraclavicular nerves (C3, C4)
  - Great auricular nerve (C2, C3)
  - Greater occipital nerve (C2)
