= Cutaneous nerve of forearm =

Cutaneous nerve of forearm may refer to:

- Lateral cutaneous nerve of forearm
- Medial cutaneous nerve of forearm
- Posterior cutaneous nerve of forearm
