= Lateral cutaneous nerve =

Lateral cutaneous nerve may refer to:

In the upper limb:

- Lateral cutaneous nerve of forearm
- Inferior lateral cutaneous nerve of arm
- Superior lateral cutaneous nerve of arm

In the lower limb:

- Lateral cutaneous nerve of thigh
