= Cutaneous nerve of arm =

The cutaneous nerve of arm may refer to:

- Superior lateral cutaneous nerve of arm
- Posterior cutaneous nerve of arm (Posterior brachial)
- Medial cutaneous nerve of arm (Medial brachial)
