= Cutaneous branch of musculospiral nerve =

Cutaneous branch of musculospiral may refer to:

- Posterior cutaneous nerve of forearm, also known as external cutaneous branch of musculospiral nerve
- Posterior cutaneous nerve of arm, also known as internal cutaneous branch of musculospiral nerve
