= Lateral brachial cutaneous nerve =

Lateral brachial cutaneous nerve can refer to:

- Superior lateral cutaneous nerve of arm
- Inferior lateral cutaneous nerve of arm
