= Cutaneous branches of the radial nerve =

The cutaneous branches of the radial nerve are two in number:

- Posterior brachial cutaneous nerve
- Posterior antebrachial cutaneous nerve
