= Lateral cutaneous nerve of arm =

Lateral cutaneous nerve of arm may refer to:

- Inferior lateral cutaneous nerve of arm
- Superior lateral cutaneous nerve of arm
