= Posterior cutaneous =

Posterior cutaneous may refer to:

- Posterior cutaneous nerve of arm
- Posterior cutaneous nerve of the forearm
- Posterior cutaneous nerve of thigh
