= Cutaneous innervation =

Nerve function

Cutaneous innervation refers to an area of the skin which is supplied by a specific cutaneous nerve.

Dermatomes are similar; however, a dermatome only specifies the area served by a spinal nerve. In some cases, the dermatome is less specific (when a spinal nerve is the source for more than one cutaneous nerve), and in other cases it is more specific (when a cutaneous nerve is derived from multiple spinal nerves.)

Modern texts are in agreement about which areas of the skin are served by which nerves, but there are minor variations in some of the details. The borders designated by the diagrams in the 1918 edition of Gray's Anatomy are similar, but not identical, to those generally accepted today.

== In the peripheral nervous system ==
The peripheral nervous system (PNS) is divided into the somatic nervous system, the autonomic nervous system, and the enteric nervous system. However, it is the somatic nervous system, responsible for body movement and the reception of external stimuli, which allows one to understand how cutaneous innervation is made possible by the action of specific sensory fibers located on the skin, as well as the distinct pathways they take to the central nervous system. The skin, which is part of the integumentary system, plays an important role in the somatic nervous system because it contains a range of nerve endings that react to heat and cold, touch, pressure, vibration, and tissue injury.

== In the central nervous system ==
The central nervous system (CNS) works with the peripheral nervous system in cutaneous innervation. The CNS is responsible for processing the information it receives from the cutaneous nerves that detect a given stimulus, and then identifying the kind of sensory inputs which project to a specific region of the primary somatosensory cortex.

== The role of nerve endings on the surface of the skin ==
Groups of nerve terminals located in the different layers of the skin are categorized depending on whether the skin is hairy, nonhairy, or an exposed mucous membrane.

=== Hairy skin ===
The hairy parts of the body such as the forearm or the leg have two groups of nerve endings: those that end along with the hair follicles, and also with the arborizations of unmyelinated axons which are referred to as free nerve endings because they are served by both myelinated and unmyelinated axons.

=== Nonhairy skin ===
Nonhairy skin (glabrous), such as the palms of hands and the soles of feet, has three types of nerve terminations.

The first one, Meissner's corpuscles are encapsulated nerve endings attached to the epidermis in the dermal papilli that detect changes in texture and vibrations.

Merkel's discs are arborizations of nonmyelinated axons that end in terminals on specialized tactile cells and which detect sustained touch and pressure.

Lastly, there are also free nerve endings which are similar in structure to those in hairy skin, though they are more numerous.

=== Exposed mucous membranes ===
The exposed mucous membranes of the lips, the anal mucous membrane, and the external genital organs form the most densely innervated parts of the body. Though there is no specific categorization, both free nerve endings and unencapsulated nerve endings of myelinated axons are found within the dermis of those areas.

The cornea, one of the other exposed mucous membranes, contains free nerve endings served by nonmyelinated axons.

The conjunctiva contains a less dense distribution of free nerve endings that are served by both myelinated and unmyelinated axons.

== Distribution of sensory neurons ==
The distribution of the sensory neurons within the skin accounts for the large and overlapping receptive fields of the skin. The size of the receptive fields in turn explains why almost any given stimulus to the human skin can potentially activate a very large number of nerve terminals. Therefore, it is more likely that a stimulus caused by the prick of a needle be detected by more than a hundred nerve endings all sharing the same receptive field, than for that same needle prick to be detected by only one nerve ending.

== Types of sensory neurons ==
The different kinds of sensory stimuli that are picked up by sensory neurons are grouped into two categories: epicritic and protopathic.

Epicritic neurons detect gentle touch such as caresses; light vibrations; the ability to recognize the shape of an object being held; and two-point discrimination, or the spacing of two points being touched simultaneously.

Protopathic neurons are responsible for detecting pain, itch, tickle, and temperature. The different types of stimuli that are detected by a given receptor allow for a relative specificity between stimuli and receptor.

== Pathways to the CNS ==
The sensory modality that is detected by the afferent fibers is an important factor to consider because it determines the pathway that the dorsal root ganglion neurons will take within the central nervous system. The sensory neurons coming from the body synapse in the dorsal horn of the spinal cord, bringing in information about touch sensations (epicritic), or modalities of pain (protopathic). While both types of sensory neurons must first synapse in the dorsal horn of the spinal cord, the area of the dorsal horn where they synapse is different. Their pathway to the thalamus is also different.

Neurons that carry information about touch, vibration, and proprioception sensations from the lower body enter the spinal cord below spinal level T6, where they synapse in the dorsal horn to form reflex circuits, but also send axon branches through the gracile fascicle to the brainstem. Similarly, information from the upper body enters the spinal cord at level T6 and above, and ascend toward the brainstem in the Cuneate fasciculus. Together the gracile and cuneate form the dorsal column in the spine.

Neurons that carry information about pain and temperature synapse in the dorsal horn at the anterolateral fascicles.

While the neurons for touch sensations ascend ipsilaterally through the posterior column-medial lemniscus pathway to the thalamus; neurons for pain and temperature ascend contralaterally to the thalamus through the anterolateral system.

When both sensory pathways reach the integrating center that is the thalamus, they make their final ascent to the somatosensory areas in the postcentral gyrus of the cerebral cortex.

== See also ==
- Nerve supply of the human arm
- Nerve supply of the human leg
- Nerve supply of the human head
