= Intercostobrachial nerve =

Nerve providing sensation to armpit and upper arm

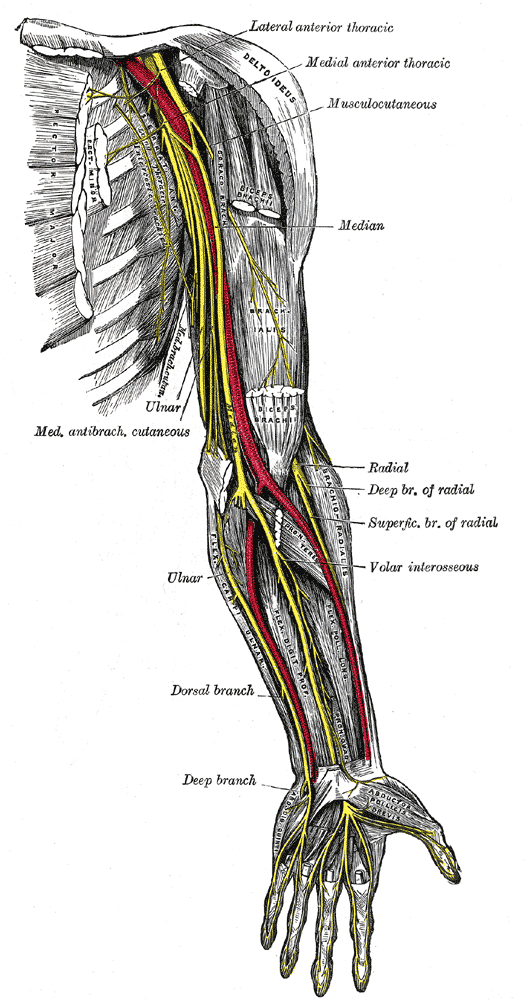
- Nerves of the left upper extremity. (Intercostobrachial nerve visible near top center.)

Details
- From: Intercostal nerves #2 and #3

Identifiers
- Latin: nervi intercostobrachiales
- TA98: A14.2.04.012
- TA2: 6476
- FMA: 75486

The intercostobrachial nerve is the name applied to the lateral cutaneous branch of the second intercostal nerve. It arises anterior to the long thoracic nerve. It provides sensory innervation to the skin of the axilla, and a variable region of the medial side of the upper arm.

== Anatomy ==
The lateral cutaneous branch of the second intercostal nerve does not divide like other intercostal nerves into an anterior and a posterior branch.

=== Course ===
It pierces the intercostalis externus muscle and the serratus anterior muscle, crosses the axilla to the medial side of the arm, and joins with a filament from the medial brachial cutaneous nerve. It then pierces the fascia, and supplies the skin of the upper half of the medial and posterior part of the arm, communicating with the posterior brachial cutaneous branch of the radial nerve.

=== Relations ===
The size of the intercostobrachial nerve is in inverse relationship to that of the medial brachial cutaneous nerve.

=== Variation ===
An additional intercostobrachial nerve is frequently given off from the lateral cutaneous branch of the third intercostal nerves; it supplies filaments to the axilla and medial side of the arm.

== Clinical significance ==
It is often the source of referred cardiac pain.

The intercostobrachial nerve is sometimes divided in axillary node clearance (ANC), such as that done for breast cancer surgery which requires the removal of the axillary nodes. Sensation to the cutaneous region supplied by the nerve is affected.

== See also ==
- Cutaneous innervation of the upper limbs

== Additional images ==
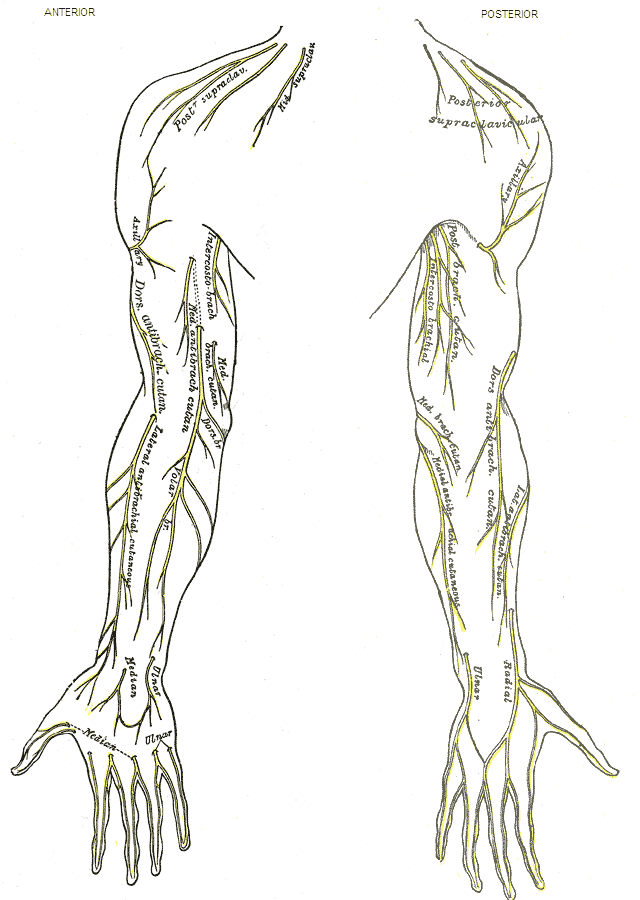
Cutaneous nerves of right upper extremity.

Diagram of segmental distribution of the cutaneous nerves of the right upper extremity.

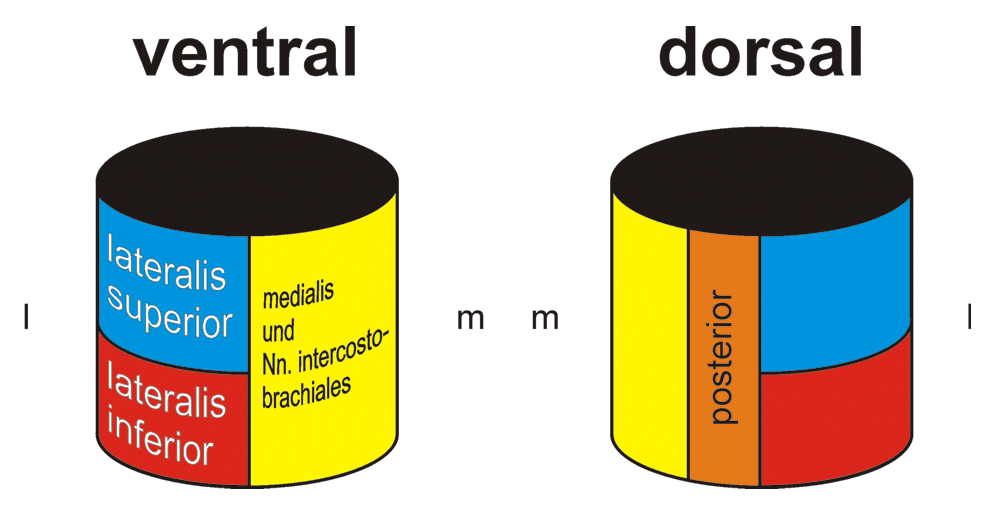
Innervation
