= Lateral cutaneous branch =

Lateral cutaneous branch can refer to:

- Lateral cutaneous nerve of forearm
- Lateral cutaneous branches of intercostal nerves
- lateral cutaneous branches of torso, of ventral primary ramus of thoracic spinal nerves

From the 12 pairs of thoracic spinal nerves, an anterior and a posterior primary rami will supply motor and sensory innervation to the thoracic region.

The anterior rami will follow the course of the rib - T1 will contribute to the brachial plexus & a smaller branch will form the first intercostal nerve - T2 and sometimes T1 contributes to the intercostobrachial nerve

Each intercostal nerve gives off a lateral cutaneous branch which divides into an anterior branch and a posterior branch which supplies the overlying skin. Intercostal nerves terminates as anterior cutaneous branches which supply the skin close to the midline. As intercostal nerves course along with their adjacent ribs, they give off a number of muscular branches to supply - Internal intercostals - External intercostalis - Innermost intercostals - Serratus posterior - Transversus thoracic - transverse abdominalis - Internal abdominal oblique - External abdominal oblique - Rectus adbominus

The intercostal nerves will also supply adjacent blood vessels, bone, joints, and ligaments
