= Medial cord =

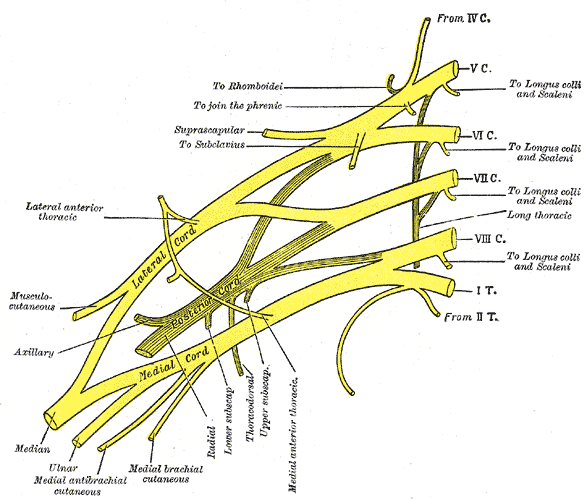
- Diagram of the brachial plexus. (Medial cord is at bottom left.)

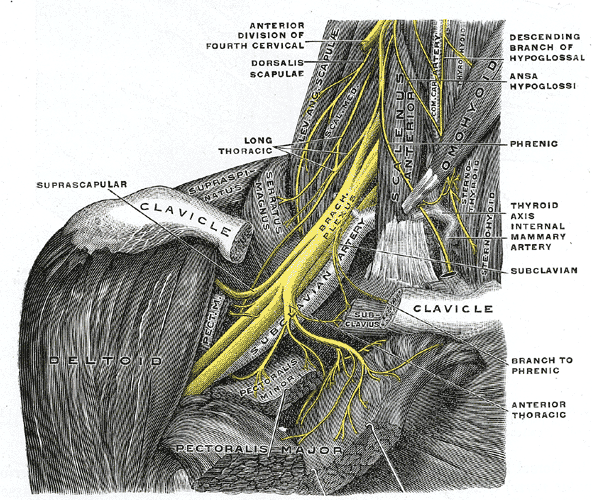
- The right brachial plexus with its short branches, viewed from in front. The Sternomastoid and Trapezius muscles have been completely, the Omohyoid and Subclavius have been partially, removed; a piece has been sawed out of the clavicle; the Pectoralis muscles have been incised and reflected.

Details
- From: Brachial plexus - lower trunk
- To: Median pectoral medial brachial cutaneous medial antebrachial cutaneous median ulnar

Identifiers
- Latin: fasciculus medialis plexus brachialis
- TA98: A14.2.03.022
- TA2: 6417
- FMA: 45236

The medial cord is the part of the brachial plexus formed by of the anterior division of the lower trunk (C8-T1). Its name comes from it being medial to the axillary artery as it passes through the axilla. The other cords of the brachial plexus are the posterior cord and lateral cord.

The medial cord gives rise to the following nerves from proximal to distal:

- medial pectoral nerve (C8-T1)
- medial brachial cutaneous nerve (T1)
- medial antebrachial cutaneous nerve (C8-T1)
- medial head of median nerve (C8-T1) [other part of median nerve comes from lateral cord]
- ulnar nerve (C8-T1, occasionally C7)

== Additional images ==
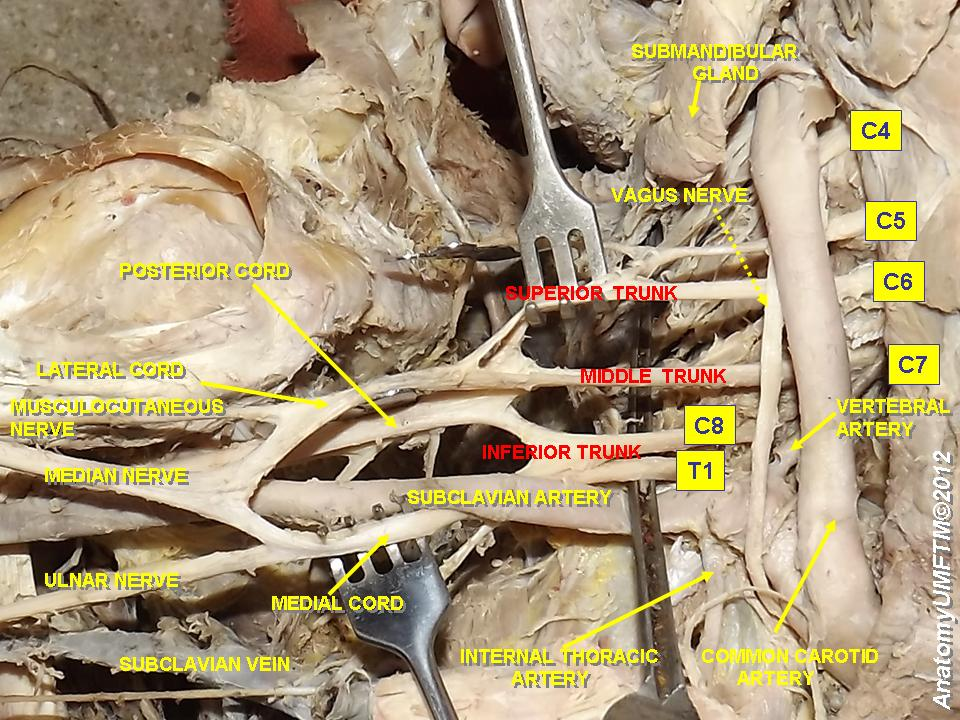
Brachial plexus
