= Supraclavicular nerves =

Nerves of the neck and shoulder

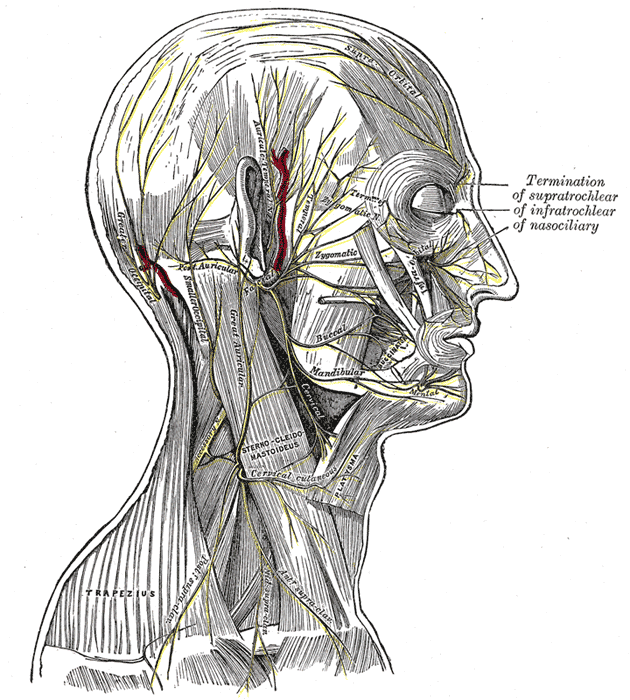
- The nerves of the scalp, face, and side of neck. (Supraclavicular nerves visible at bottom.)

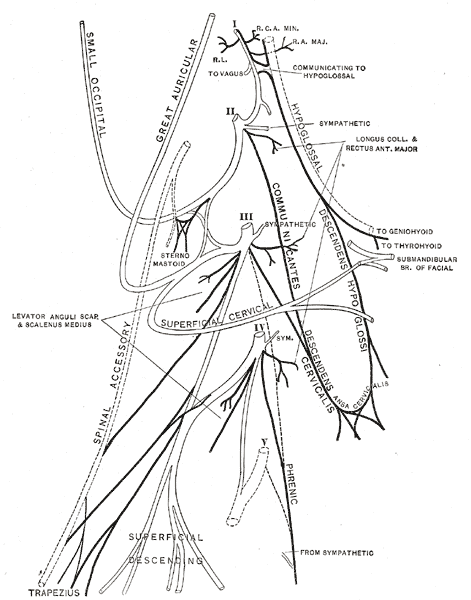
- Plan of the cervical plexus. (Superficial descending labeled at bottom left.)

Details
- From: C3–C4 of cervical plexus
- Innervates: Cutaneous innervation of the skin above and below the clavicle

Identifiers
- Latin: nervi supraclaviculares
- TA98: A14.2.02.024
- TA2: 6391
- FMA: 65414

The supraclavicular nerve is a cutaneous (sensory) nerve of the cervical plexus that arises from the third and fourth cervical (spinal) nerves. It emerges from beneath the posterior border of the sternocleidomastoid muscle, then split into multiple branches. Together, these innervate the skin over the shoulder.

The supraclavicular nerve can be blocked during shoulder surgery.

== Anatomy ==
=== Origin ===
The supraclavicular nerve is a branch of the cervical plexus that arises from cervical (spinal) nerves C3-C4 with the predominant contribution from C4.

=== Course ===
It emerges at the posterior border of the sternocleidomastoid muscle alongside the other three cutaneous branches of the cervical plexus, then promptly divides into several branches. The nerves descend in the posterior triangle of the neck beneath the platysma muscle and the deep cervical fascia. Near the clavicle, the supraclavicular nerves perforate the fascia and the platysma muscle to become cutaneous. They are arranged, according to their position, into three groups—anterior, middle, and posterior.

==== Medial supraclavicular nerves ====
The medial supraclavicular nerves or anterior supraclavicular nerves (nn. supraclaviculares anteriores; suprasternal nerves) cross obliquely over the external jugular vein and the clavicular and sternal heads of the sternocleidomastoideus, and supply the skin as far as the middle line. They furnish one or two filaments to the sternoclavicular joint.

==== Intermedial supraclavicular nerves ====
The intermedial supraclavicular nerve middle supraclavicular nerves (nn. supraclaviculares medii; supraclavicular nerves) cross the clavicle, and supply the skin over the pectoralis major and deltoideus, communicating with the cutaneous branches of the upper intercostal nerves.

==== Lateral supraclavicular nerves ====
The lateral supraclavicular nerve or posterior supraclavicular nerves (nn. supraclaviculares posteriores; supra-acromial nerves) pass obliquely across the outer surface of the trapezius and the acromion, and supply the skin of the upper and posterior parts of the shoulder.

== Function ==
The supraclavicular nerves together innervate the skin over the shoulder.

== Clinical significance ==
A supraclavicular nerve block is useful when performing surgery on the shoulder, anaesthetising a large area of skin.

The supraclavicular nerves are vulnerable during surgery on the clavicle, and must be identified early on in surgeries to reduce the risk of nerve injury and neuroma.

== Additional images ==
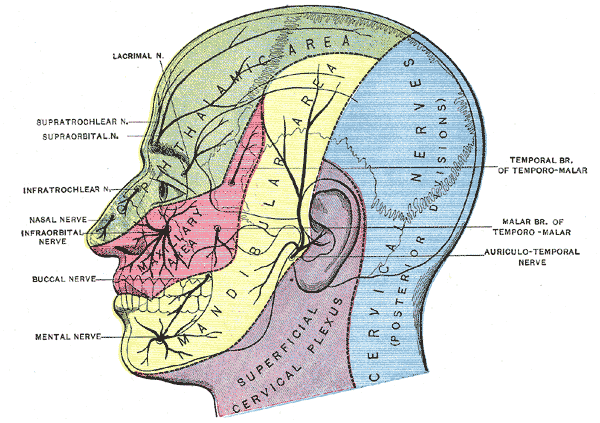
Dermatome distribution of the trigeminal nerve

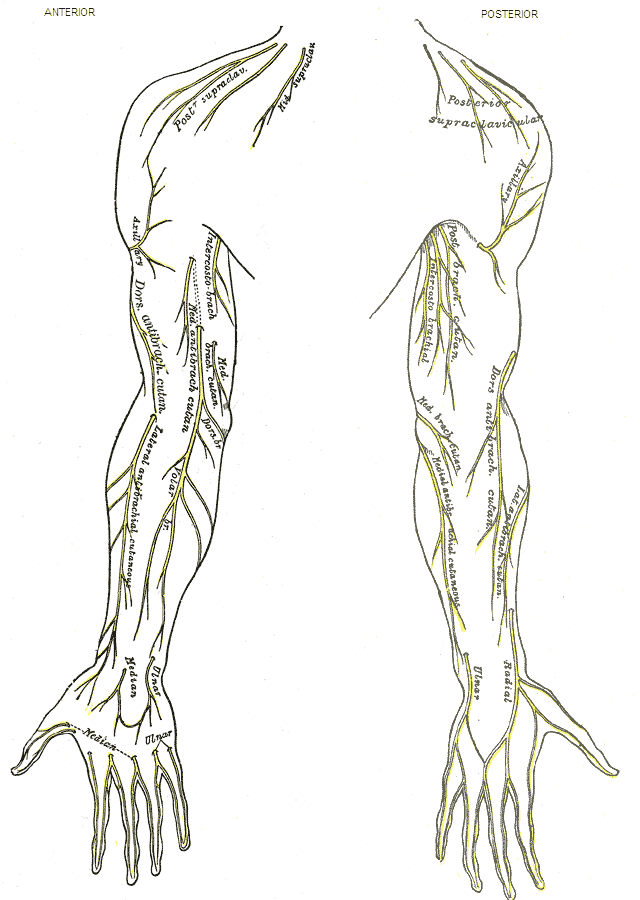
Cutaneous nerves of right upper extremity.

Diagram of segmental distribution of the cutaneous nerves of the right upper extremity.

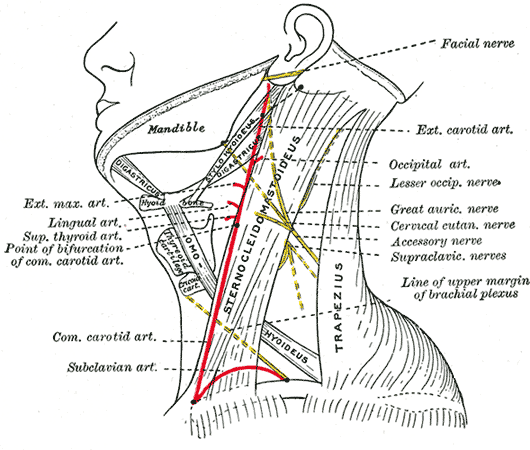
Side of neck, showing chief surface markings.
