= Medial cutaneous nerve of arm =

Arm nerve

Medial brachial cutaneous nerve
- Diagram of segmental distribution of the cutaneous nerves of the right upper extremity. Anterior view. "Medial Brachial Cutan. T1-T2" labeled near center, in yellow.

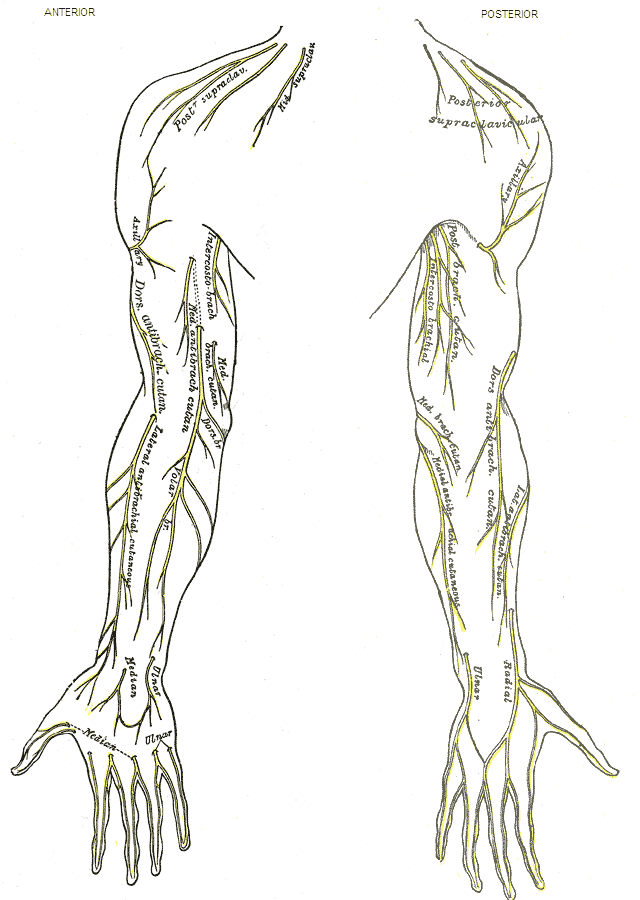
- Cutaneous nerves of right upper extremity.

Details
- From: T1 (medial cord)

Identifiers
- Latin: n. cutaneus brachii medialis
- TA98: A14.2.03.027
- TA2: 6445
- FMA: 65246

The medial brachial cutaneous nerve (lesser internal cutaneous nerve; medial cutaneous nerve of arm) is a sensory branch of the medial cord of the brachial plexus derived from spinal nerves C8-T1. It provides sensory innervation to the medial arm. It descends accompanied by the basilic vein.

== Anatomy ==
=== Origin ===
It is the smallest and medial-most branch of the brachial plexus, and arising from the medial cord receives its fibers from the eighth cervical and first thoracic spinal nerves.

=== Course ===
It passes through the axilla, at first lying behind, and then medial to the axillary vein, and communicates with the intercostobrachial nerve.

It descends along the medial side of the brachial artery to the middle of the arm, where it pierces the deep fascia, and is distributed to the skin of the back of the lower third of the arm, extending as far as the elbow, where some filaments are lost in the skin in front of the medial epicondyle, and others over the olecranon.

It communicates with the ulnar branch of the medial antebrachial cutaneous nerve.

== Eponym ==
The term nerve of Wrisberg (after Heinrich August Wrisberg) has been used to describe this nerve.

However, the term "nerve of Wrisberg" can also refer to the nervus intermedius branch of the facial nerve.

== See also ==
- Superior lateral cutaneous nerve of arm
- Inferior lateral cutaneous nerve of arm
- Posterior cutaneous nerve of arm

== Additional images ==
Brachial plexus

Brachial plexus with courses of spinal nerves shown

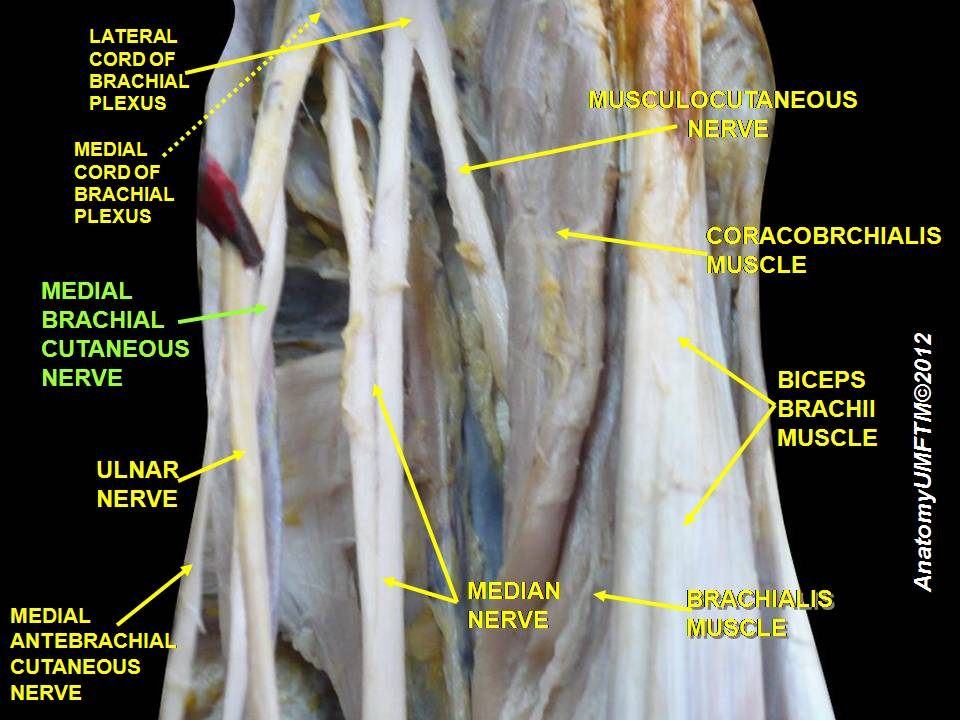
Medial brachial cutaneous nerve

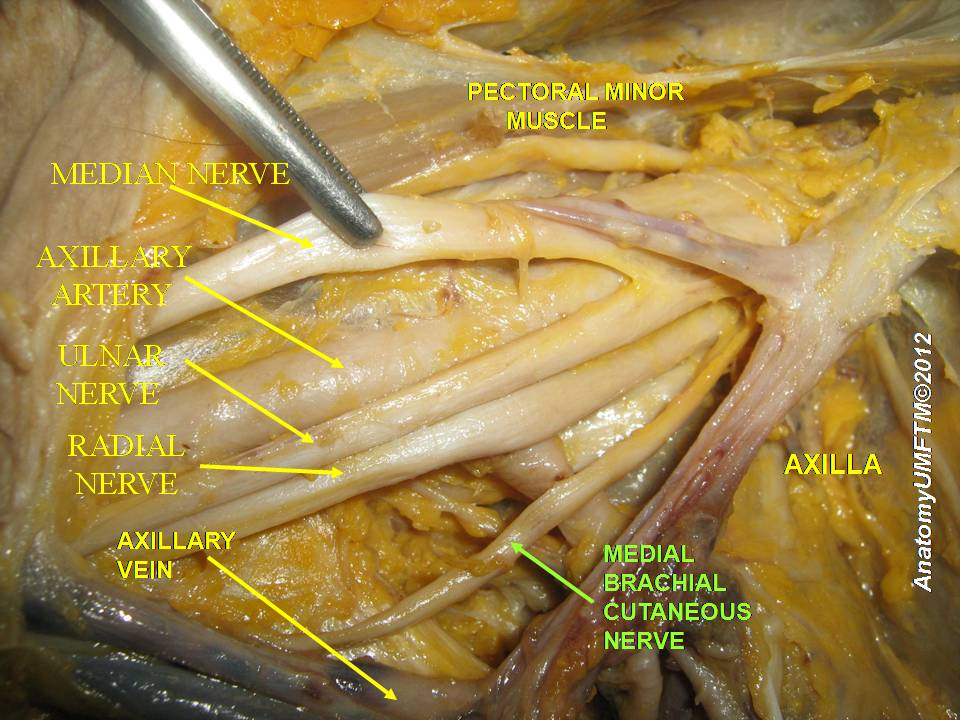
Medial brachial cutaneous nerve

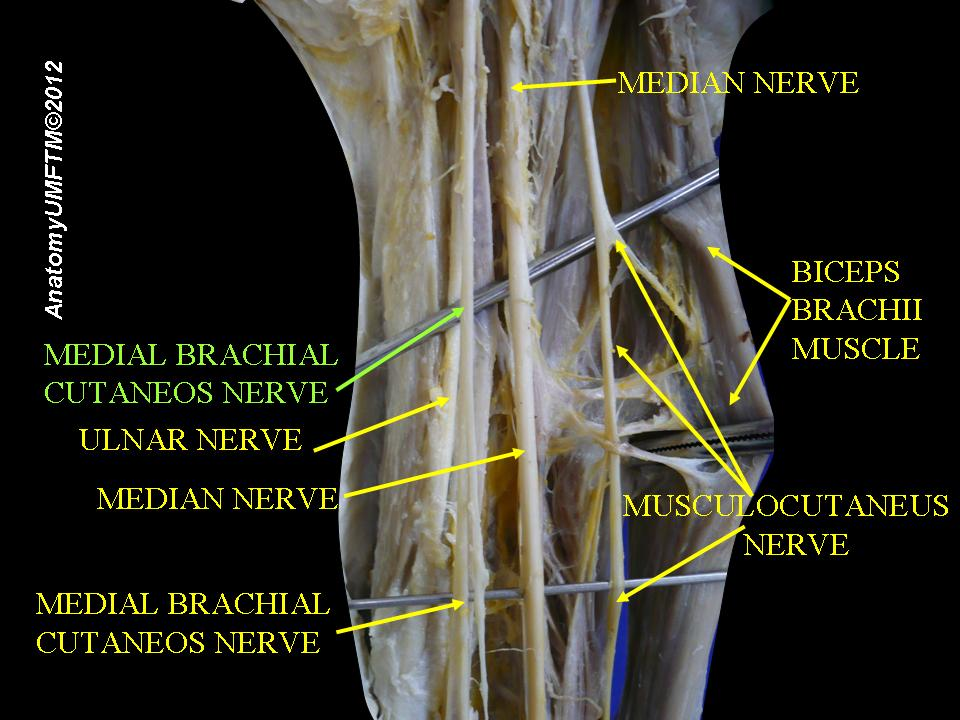
Medial brachial cutaneous nerve

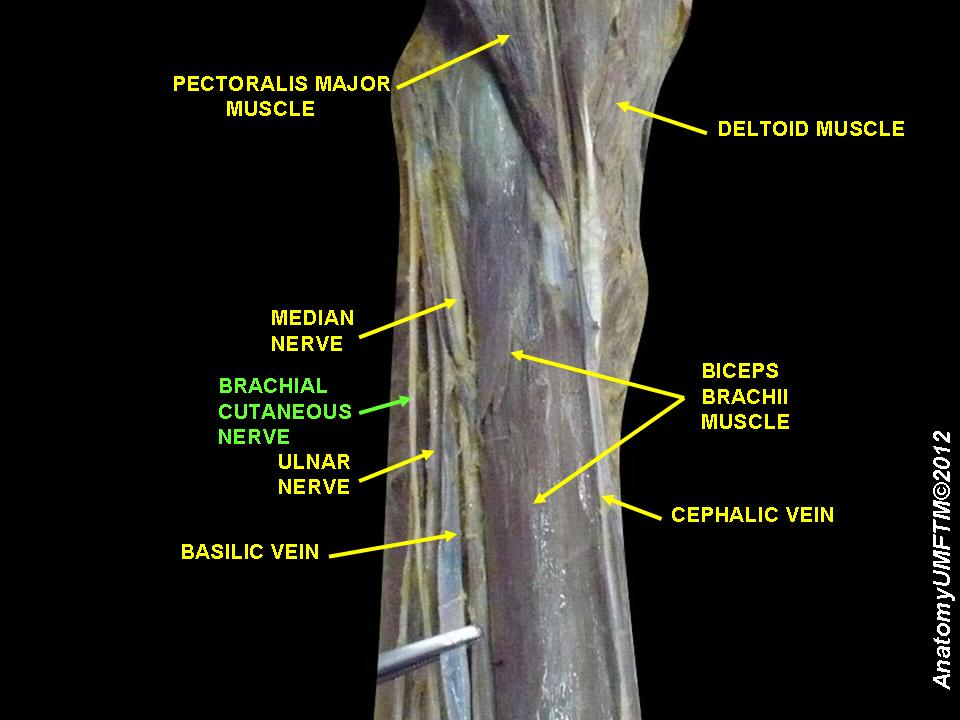
brachial cutaneous nerve

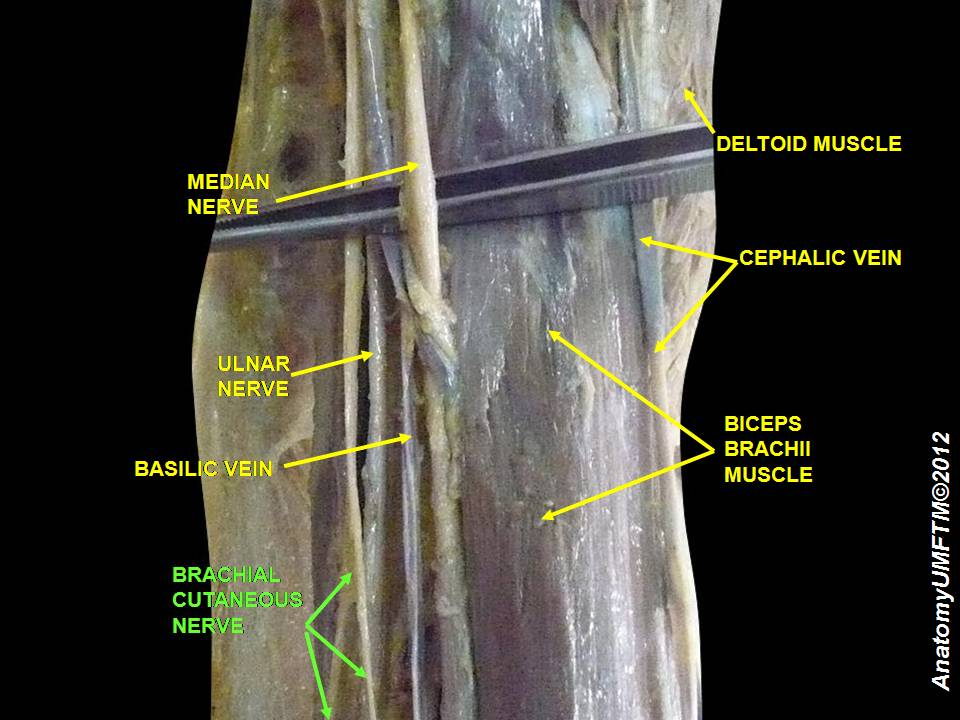
brachial cutaneous nerve

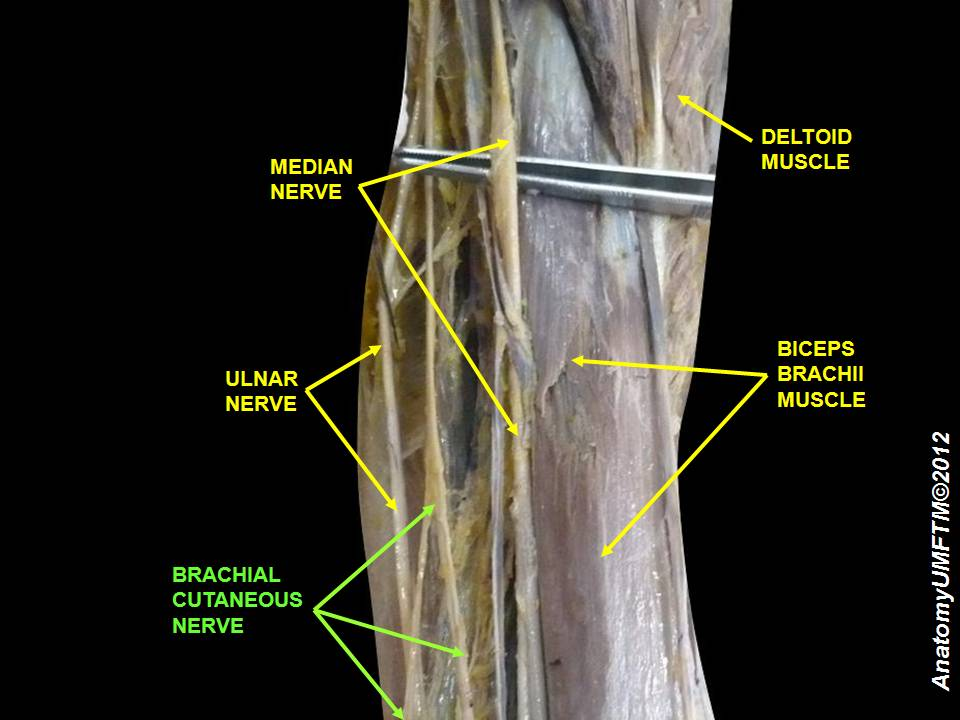
brachial cutaneous nerve

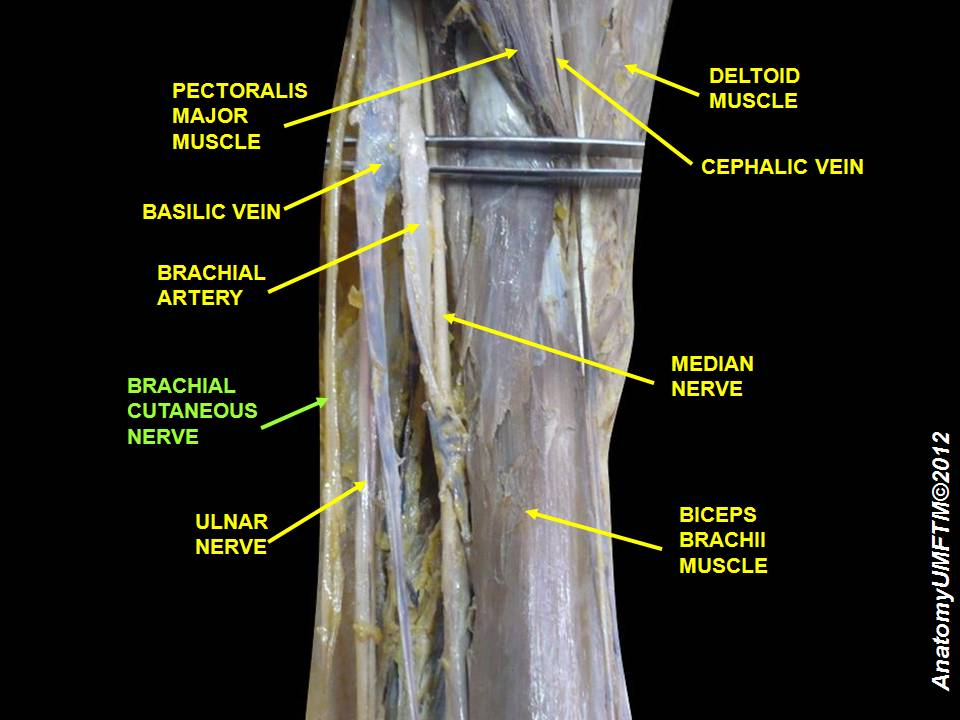
Brachial cutaneous nerve

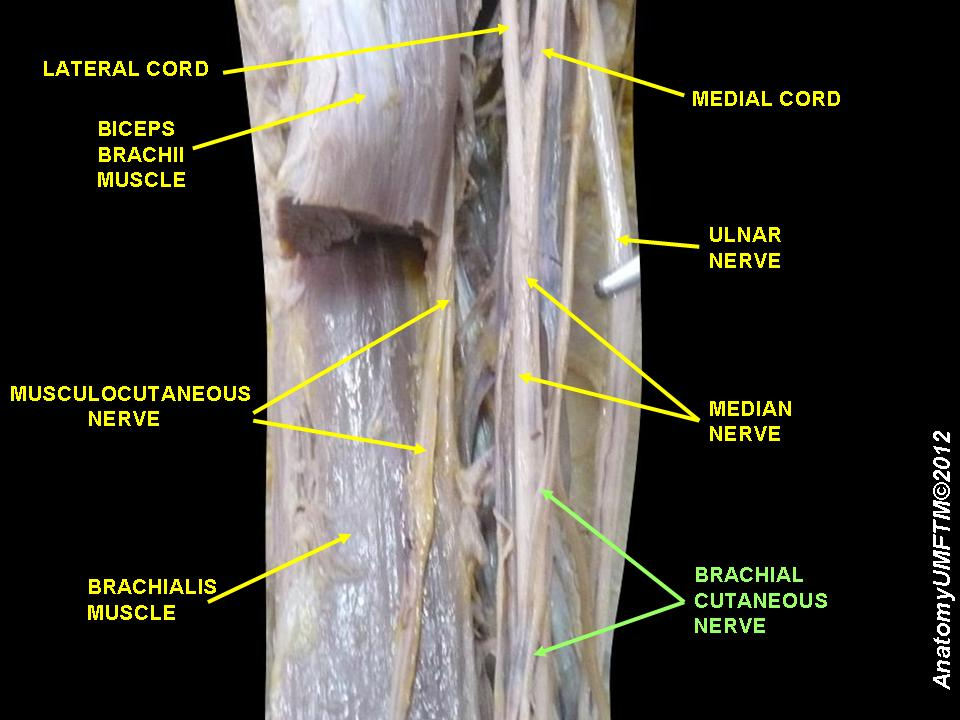
Brachial cutaneous nerve

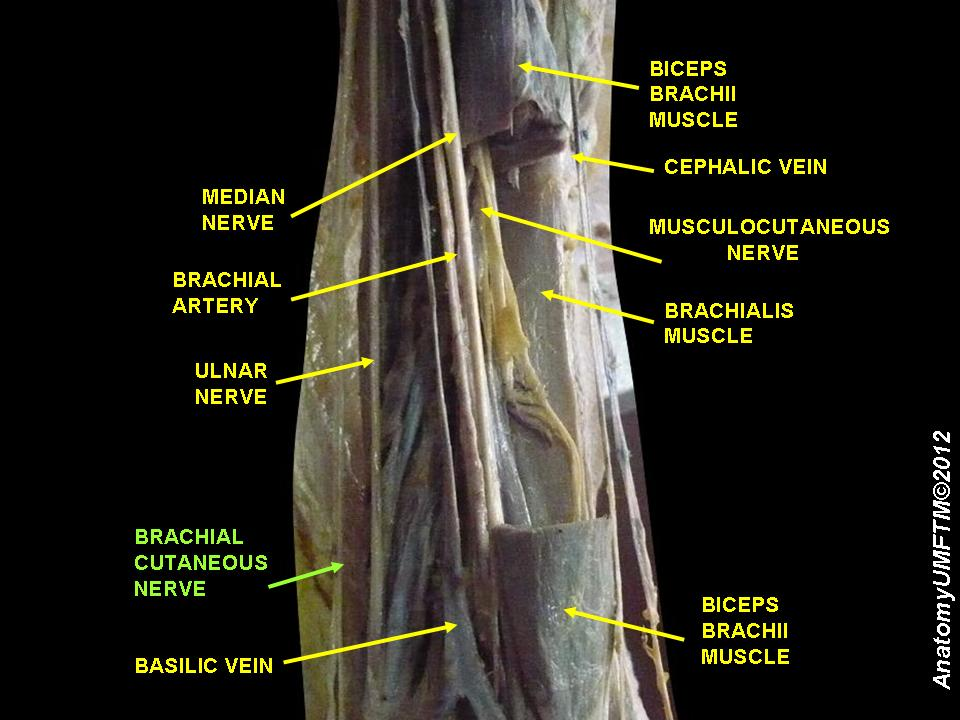
Brachial cutaneous nerve

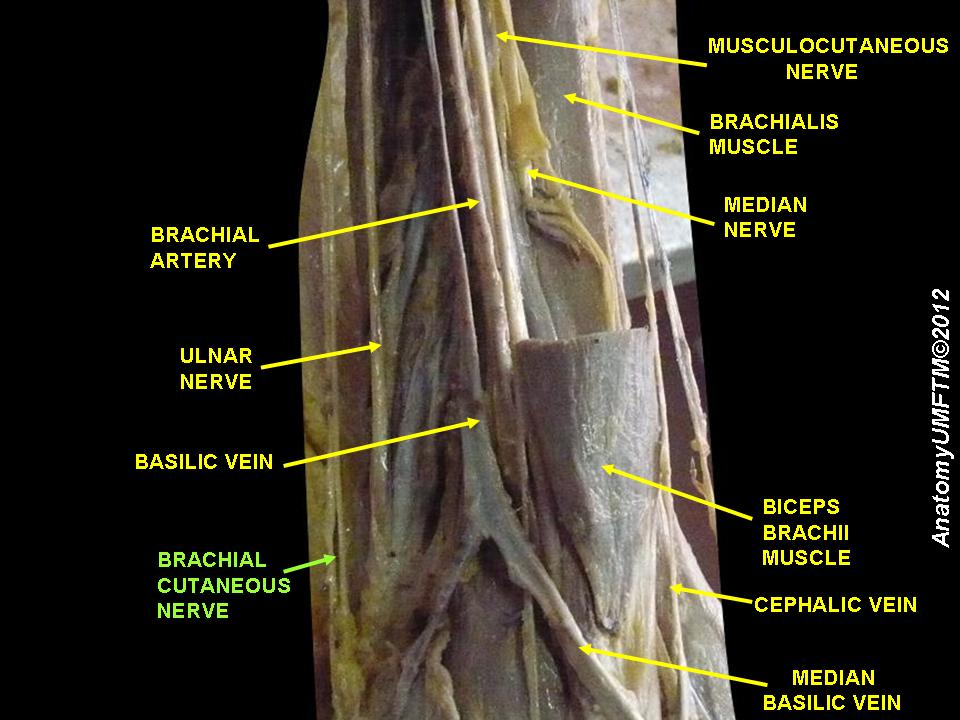
Brachial cutaneous nerve

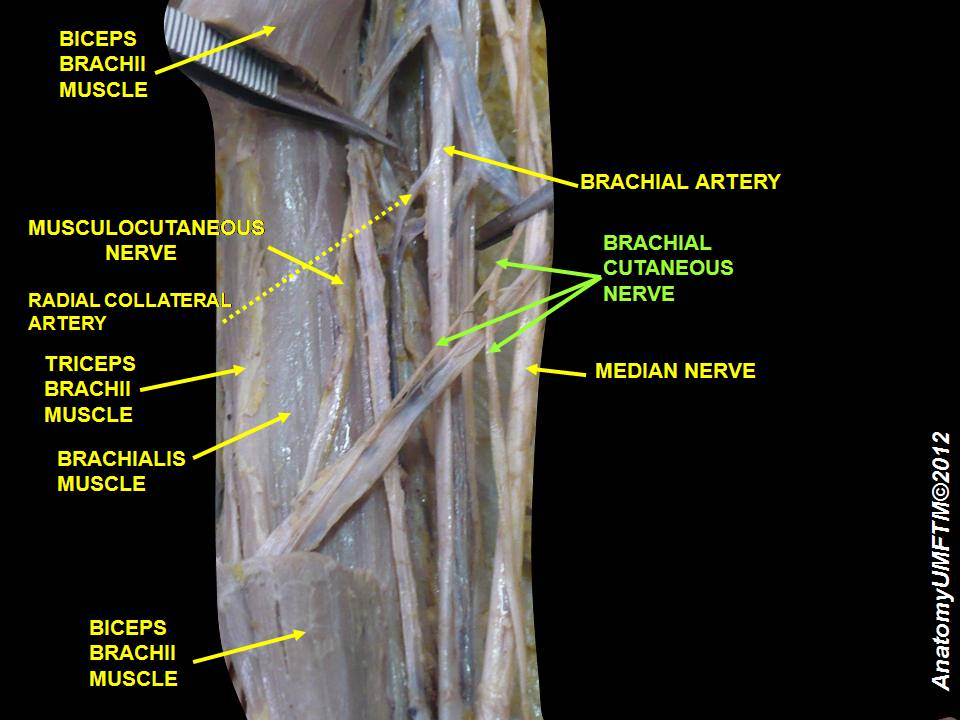
Brachial cutaneous nerve

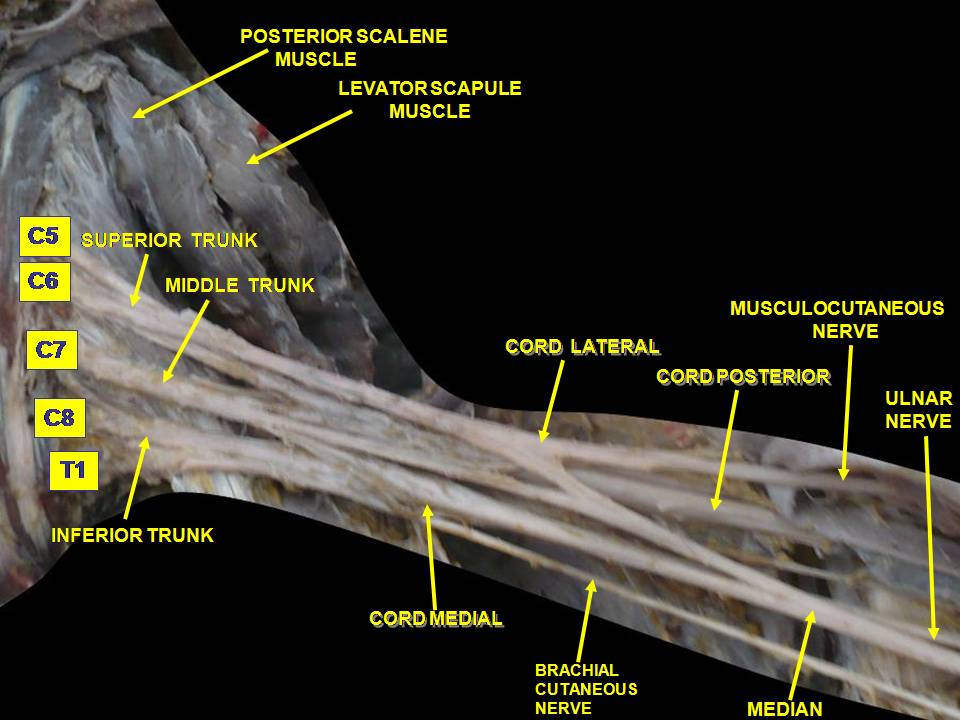
Brachial plexus.Deep dissection.Anterolateral view
