= Medial cutaneous nerve of forearm =

- Diagram of segmental distribution of the cutaneous nerves of the right upper extremity. Posterior view. ("Medial antebrach. cutan." visible in green.)

Details
- From: Medial cord

Identifiers
- Latin: nervus cutaneus antebrachii medialis
- TA98: A14.2.03.028
- TA2: 6446
- FMA: 39079

The medial cutaneous nerve of the forearm (also known as the medial antebrachial cutaneous nerve) is a sensory branch of the medial cord of the brachial plexus derived from the ventral rami of spinal nerves C8-T1. It provides sensory innervation to the skin of the medial forearm and skin overlying the olecranon. It descends through the (upper) arm within the brachial fascia alongside the basilic vein, then divides into an anterior branch and a posterior branch upon emerging from the brachial fascia; the two terminal branches travel as far distally as the wrist.

== Anatomy ==
=== Course and relations ===
It gives off a branch near the axilla, which pierces the fascia and supplies the skin covering the biceps brachii, nearly as far as the elbow.

The nerve then runs down the ulnar side of the arm medial to the brachial artery, pierces the deep fascia with the basilic vein, about the middle of the arm, and divides into a volar and an ulnar branch.

=== Branches ===
==== Volar branch ====
The volar branch (ramus volaris; anterior branch), the larger, passes usually in front of, but occasionally behind, the vena mediana cubiti (median basilic vein).

It then descends on the front of the ulnar side of the forearm, distributing filaments to the skin as far as the wrist, and communicating with the palmar cutaneous branch of the ulnar nerve.

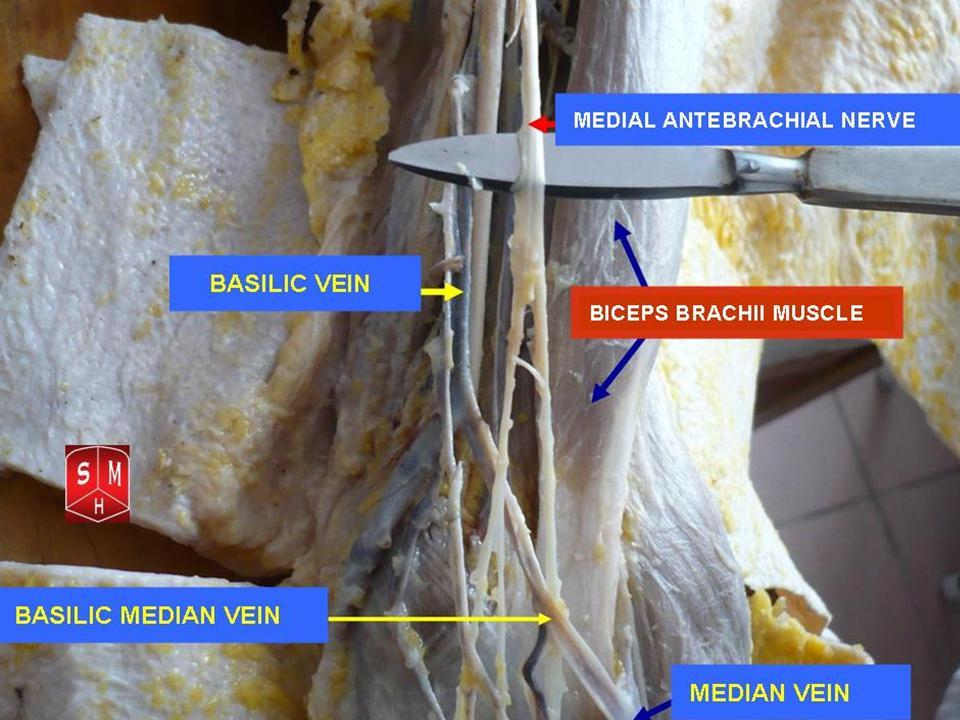
Medial antebrachial nerve

==== Ulnar branch ====
The ulnar branch (ramus ulnaris; posterior branch) passes obliquely downward on the medial side of the basilic vein, in front of the medial epicondyle of the humerus, to the back of the forearm, and descends on its ulnar side as far as the wrist, distributing filaments to the skin.

It communicates with the medial brachial cutaneous, the dorsal antebrachial cutaneous branch of the radial, and the dorsal branch of the ulnar.

== See also ==
- Dorsal antebrachial cutaneous nerve
- Lateral antebrachial cutaneous nerve
- Medial brachial cutaneous nerve

== Additional images ==
Brachial plexus with courses of spinal nerves shown

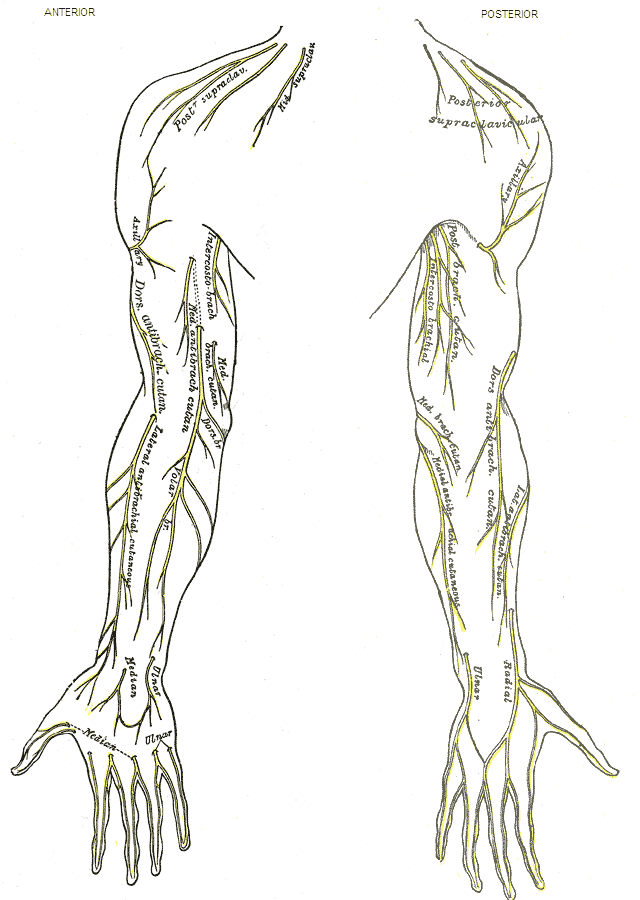
Cutaneous nerves of right upper extremity.

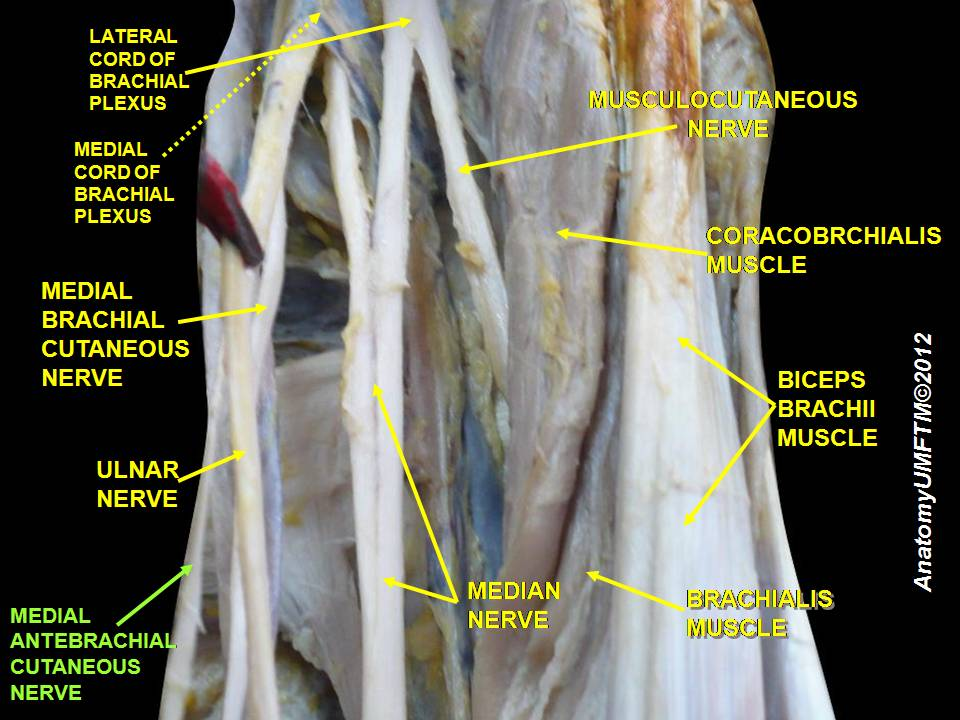
Medial antebrachial cutaneous nerve

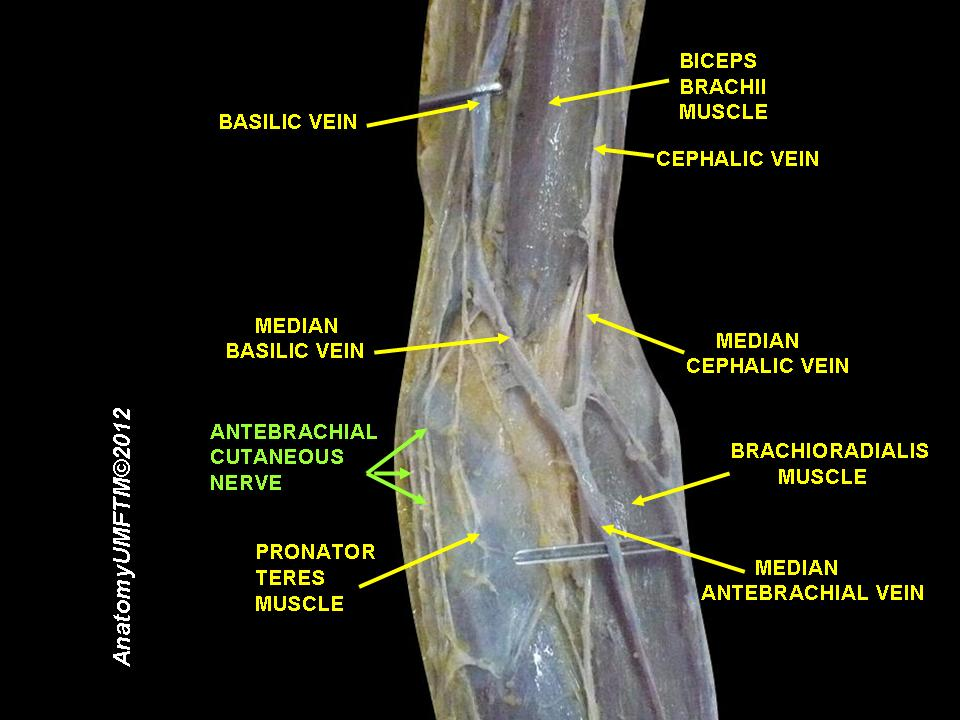
antebrachial cutaneous nerve
