= Axilla =

Area of the human body beneath the joint between arm and torso

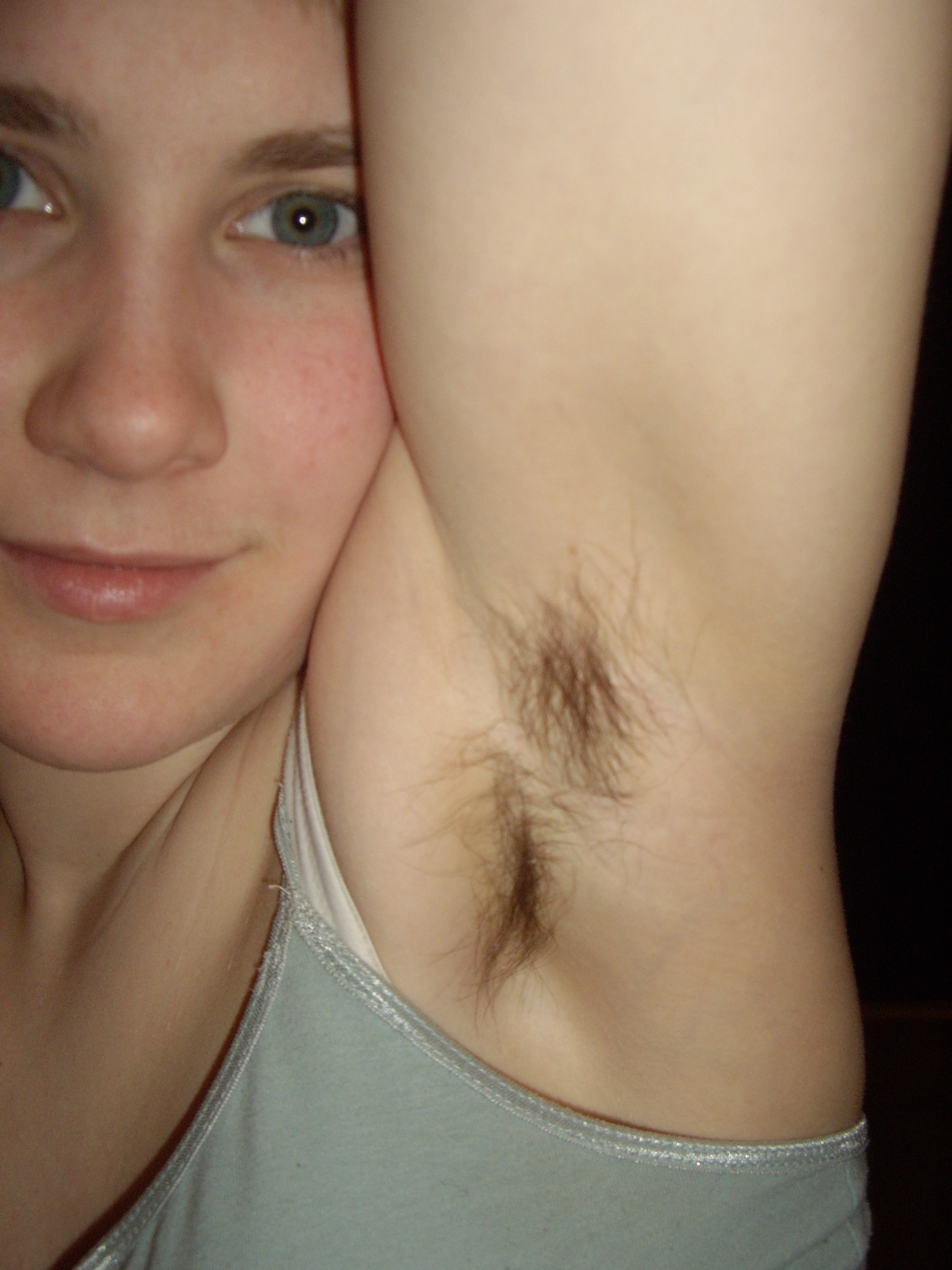
- Armpit (with hair)

Details
- Artery: Axillary artery
- Vein: Axillary vein
- Nerve: Axillary nerve, medial cord, posterior cord, lateral cord
- Lymph: Axillary lymph nodes

Identifiers
- Latin: axilla
- MeSH: D001365
- TA98: A01.1.00.021
- TA2: 140
- FMA: 24864

The axilla (pl.: axillae or axillas; also known as the armpit, underarm or oxter) is the area on the human body directly under the shoulder joint. It includes the axillary space, an anatomical space within the shoulder girdle between the arm and the thoracic cage, bounded superiorly by the imaginary plane between the superior borders of the first rib, clavicle and scapula (above which are considered part of the neck), medially by the serratus anterior muscle and thoracolumbar fascia, anteriorly by the pectoral muscles and posteriorly by the subscapularis, teres major and latissimus dorsi muscle.

The soft skin covering the lateral axilla contains many hair and sweat glands. In humans, the formation of body odor happens mostly in the axilla. These odorant substances have been suggested by some to serve as pheromones, which play a role related to mate selection, although this is a controversial topic within the scientific community. The underarms seem more important than the pubic area for emitting body odor, which may be related to human bipedalism.

== Structure ==
=== Boundaries ===
Anatomically, the boundaries of the axilla are:

	superiorly: by the outer border of first rib, superior border of scapula, and posterior border of clavicle	
medially: serratus anterior and by the ribcage	anteriorly: by the pectoralis major, minor, and subclavius posteriorly: by the subscapularis above, and teres major and latissimus dorsi below	laterally: by the humerus and the surrounding muscles of the arm (coracobrachialis and biceps brachii)
	floor/base: by the skin (visible surface of axilla)	

The lower posterior boundary is called the posterior axillary fold and this is a compound structure consisting of the latissimus dorsi and teres major muscles. It can descend after weight loss.

The anterior boundary is called the anterior axillary fold and this is rounded in shape and formed by the lower border of the pectoralis major. Some sources also include the pectoralis minor. It can elongate after weight loss.

The contents of the axilla include the axillary vein and artery, as well as the brachial plexus, lymph nodes and fat. The axilla is the space between the side of the thorax and the upper arm.

=== Contents ===
- Axillary artery and its branches
- Axillary vein and its tributaries
- Infraclavicular part of the brachial plexus
- Long thoracic and intercostobrachial nerves
- Five groups of axillary lymph nodes and the associated lymphatics
- Axillary fat and areolar tissue in which the other contents are embedded
Anatomy of the axilla
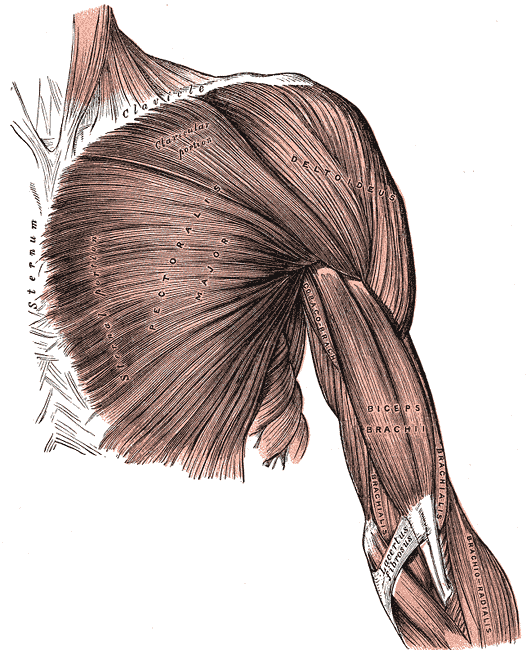
Superficial muscles of the chest and front of the arm.

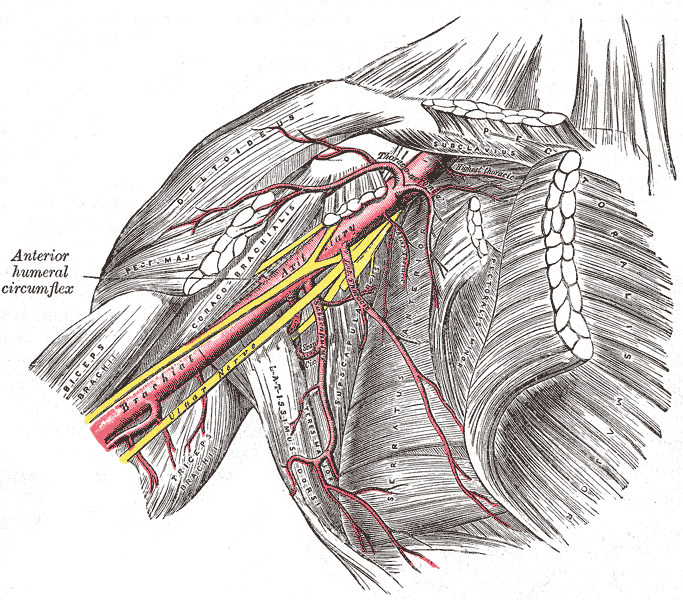
Axillary artery and its branches - anterior view of right upper limb and thorax.

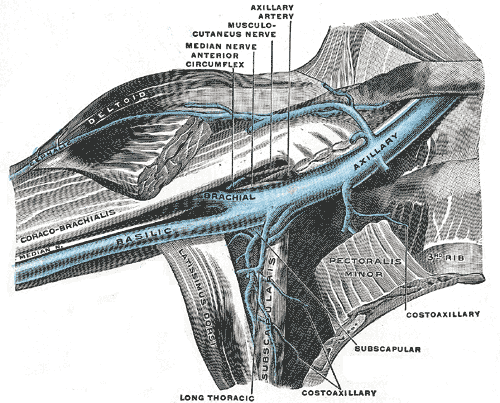
The veins of the right axilla, viewed from in front.

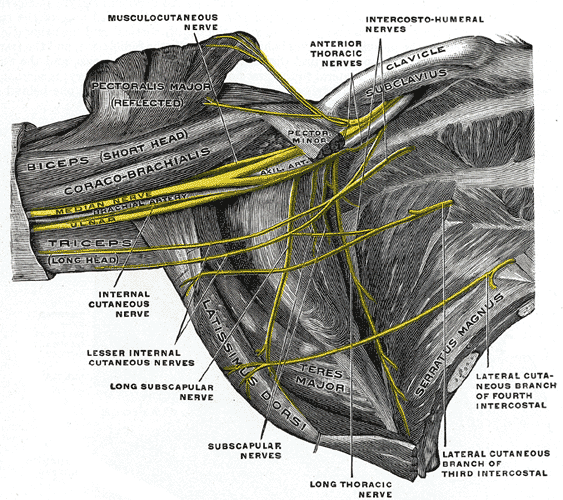
The right brachial plexus (infraclavicular portion) in the axillary fossa; viewed from below and in front.

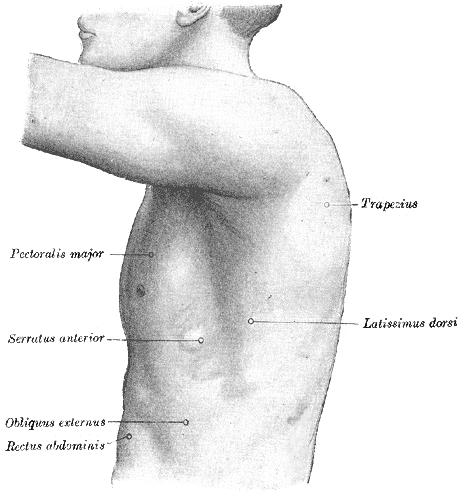
The left side of the thorax.

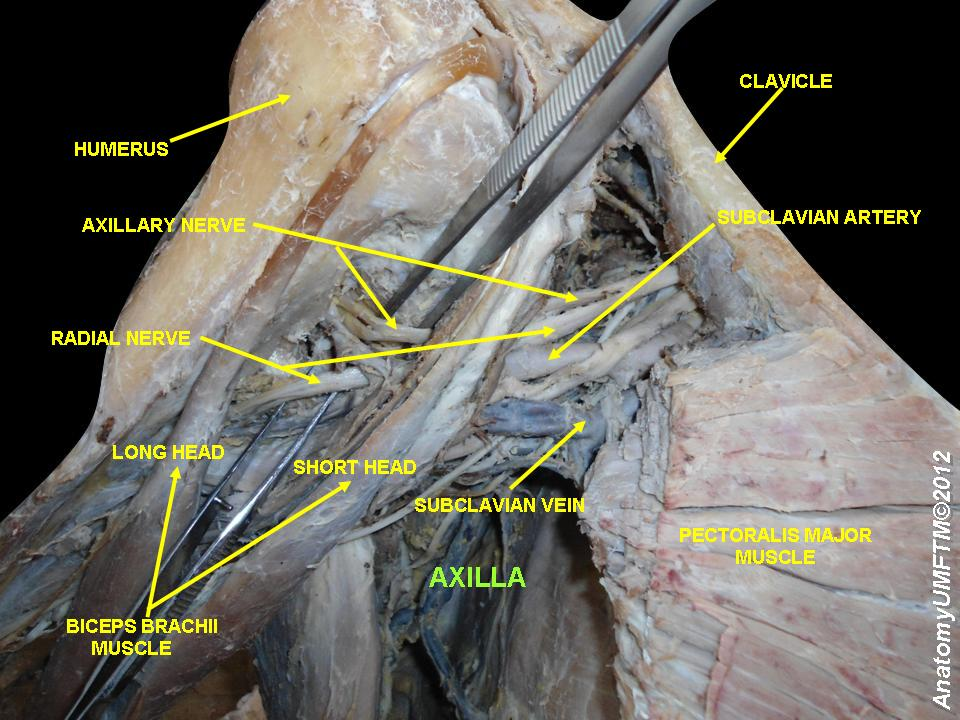
Axilla

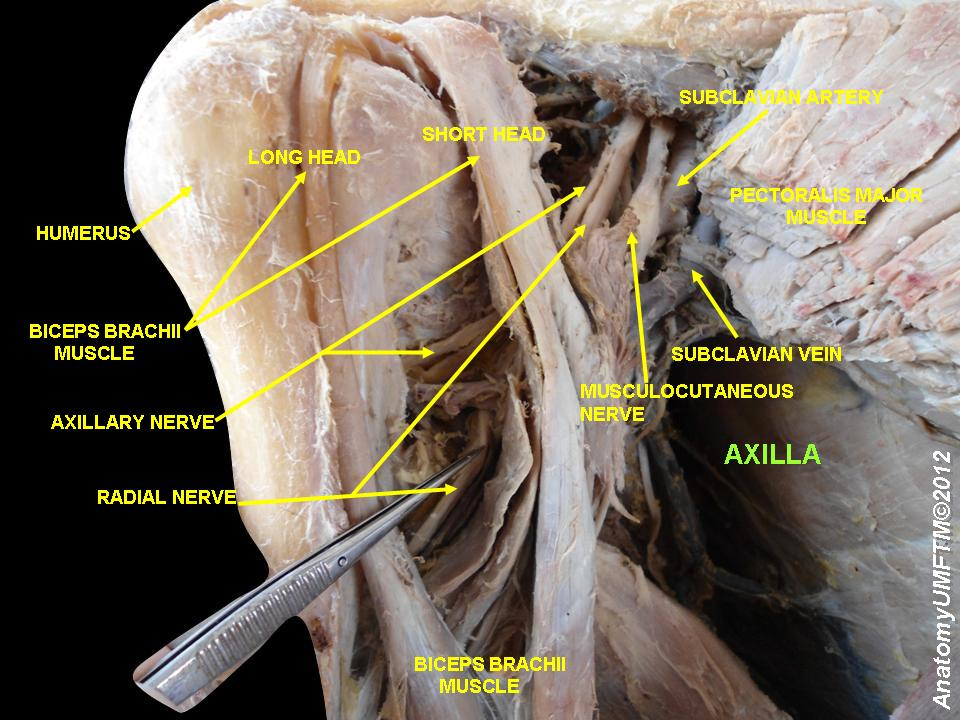
Axilla

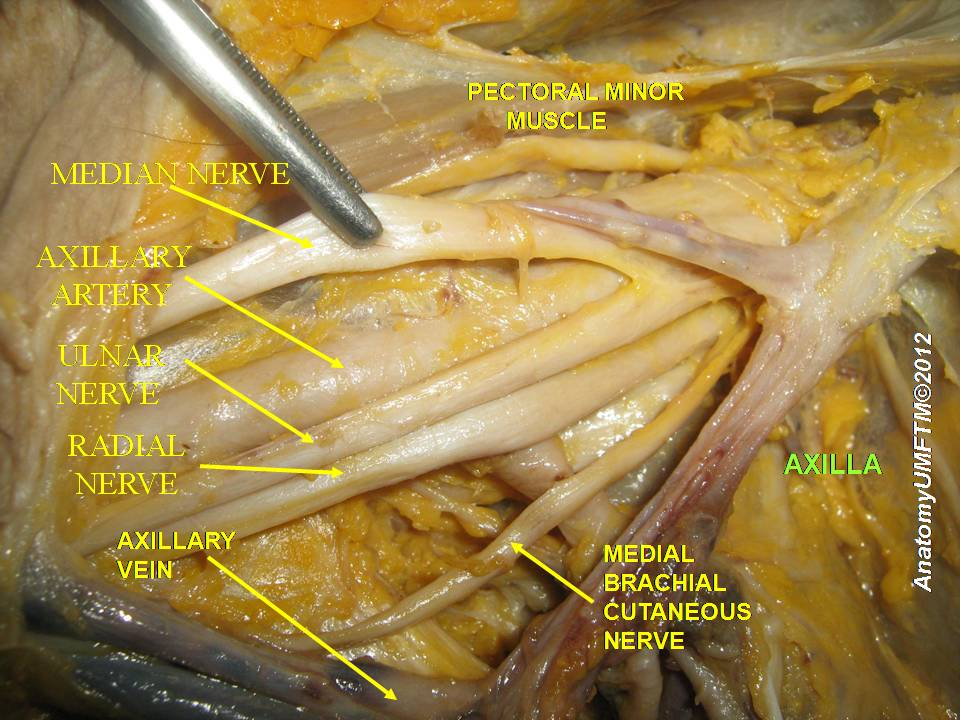
Axilla

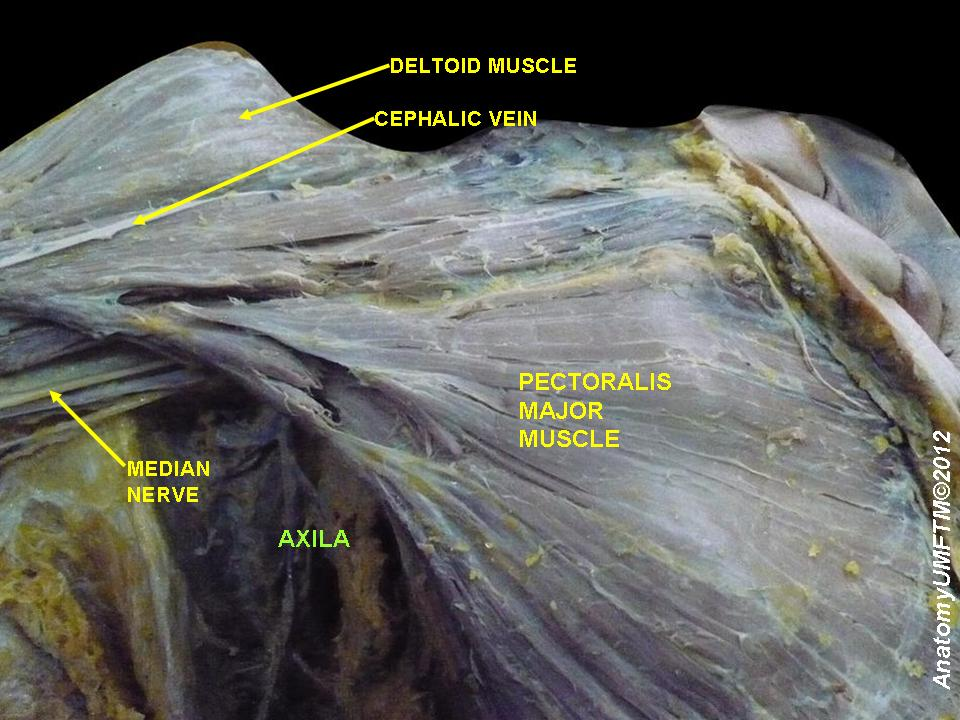
Axilla

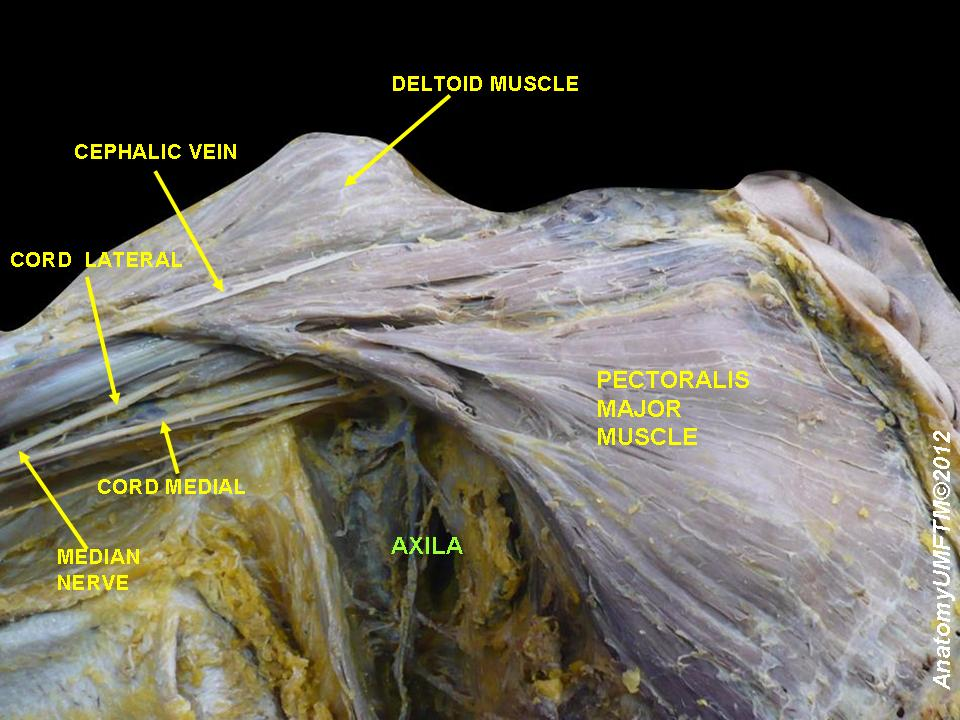
Axilla

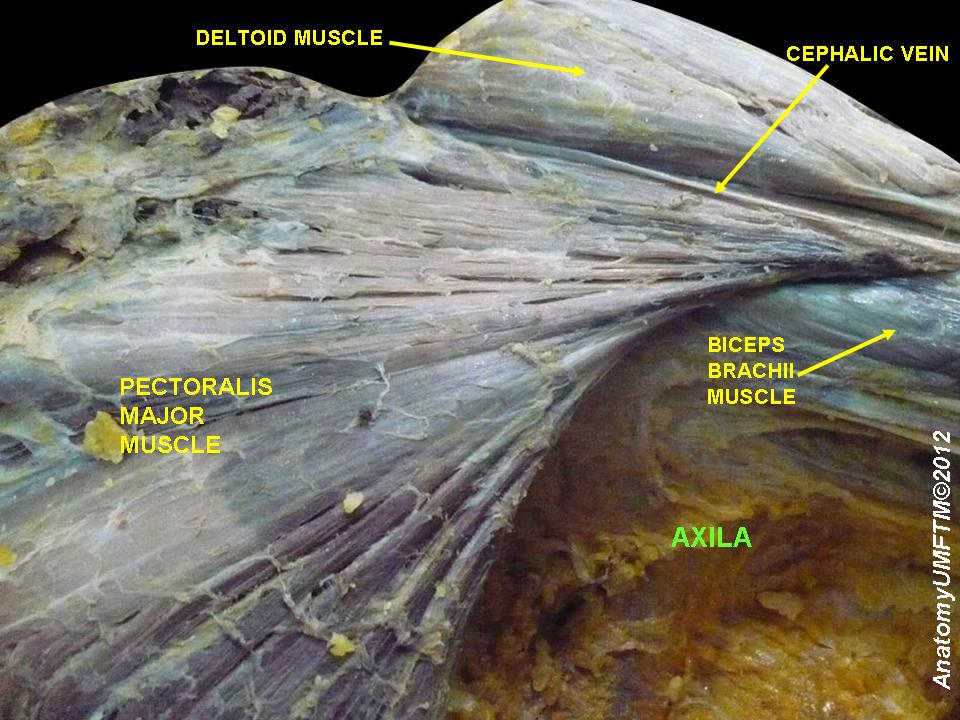
Axilla

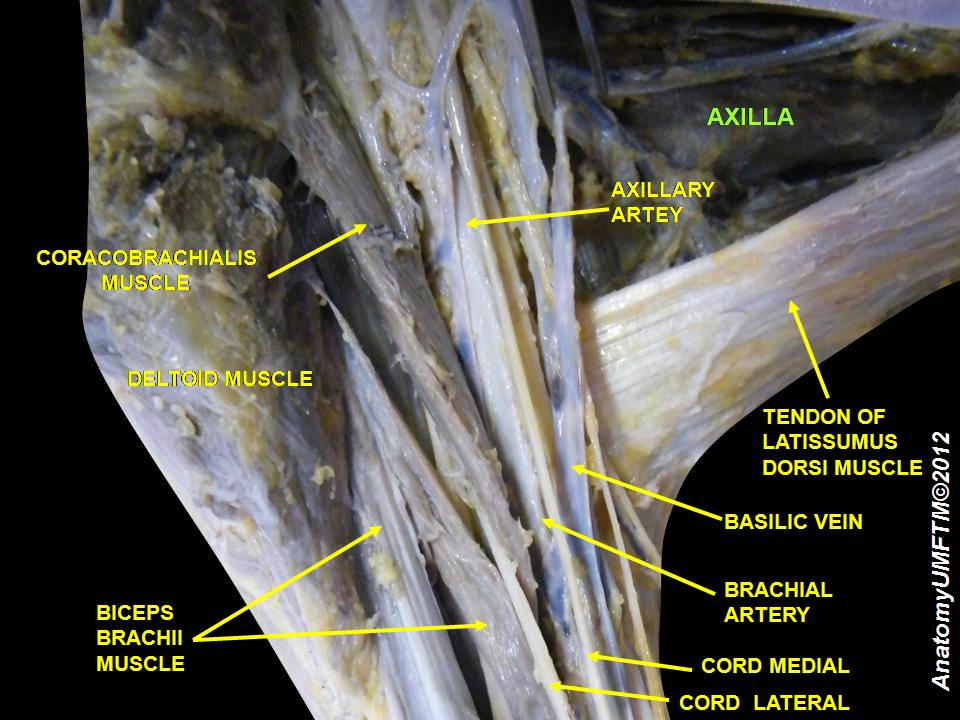
Axilla

== Society and culture ==
The term "underarm" typically refers to the outer surface of the axilla. However, the terms are sometimes used interchangeably in casual contexts. Colloquially, underarm refers to the hollow beneath the junction of the arm and shoulder.

=== Tickling ===
The underarm is a ticklish area due to the number of nerves it contains. Most people find this area to be particularly unpleasant when tickled.

=== Underarm hair ===
Underarm hair usually grows in the underarms of both females and males, beginning in adolescence.

In some modern Western cultures, it is common for older women to remove underarm hair. Some view this practice as an aesthetic matter, while others view its removal for health-related concerns. As underarm hair grows quickly, removal must be performed frequently, or stubble will appear in the axilla.

In most cultures and scenes, women retain their underarm hair for a variety of reasons, from subversion to egalitarianism to comfort or for hygienic reasons. Conversely but uncommonly, some men choose to remove their underarm hair for aesthetic reasons or to reduce friction in sports such as swimming.

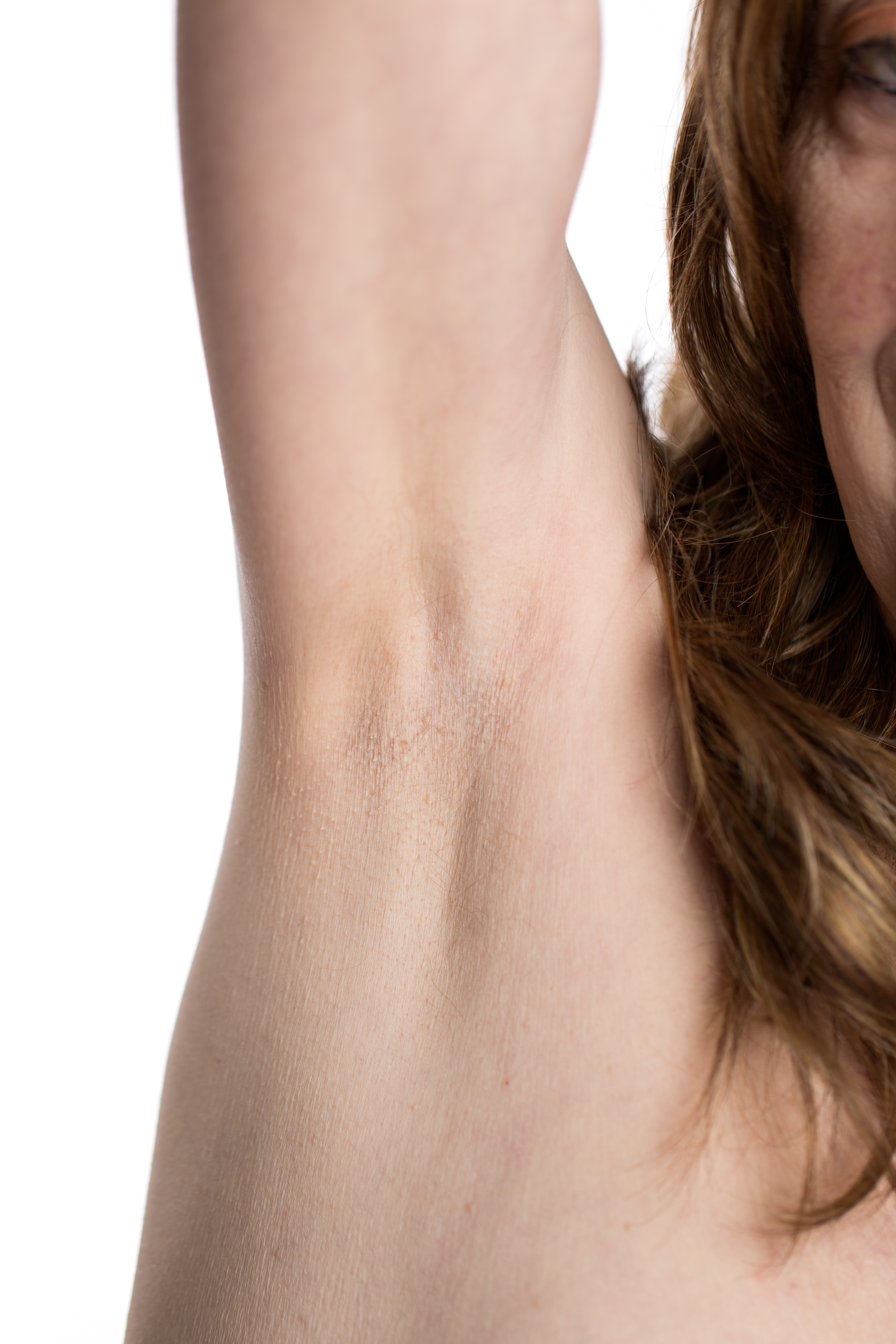
Shaved underarm

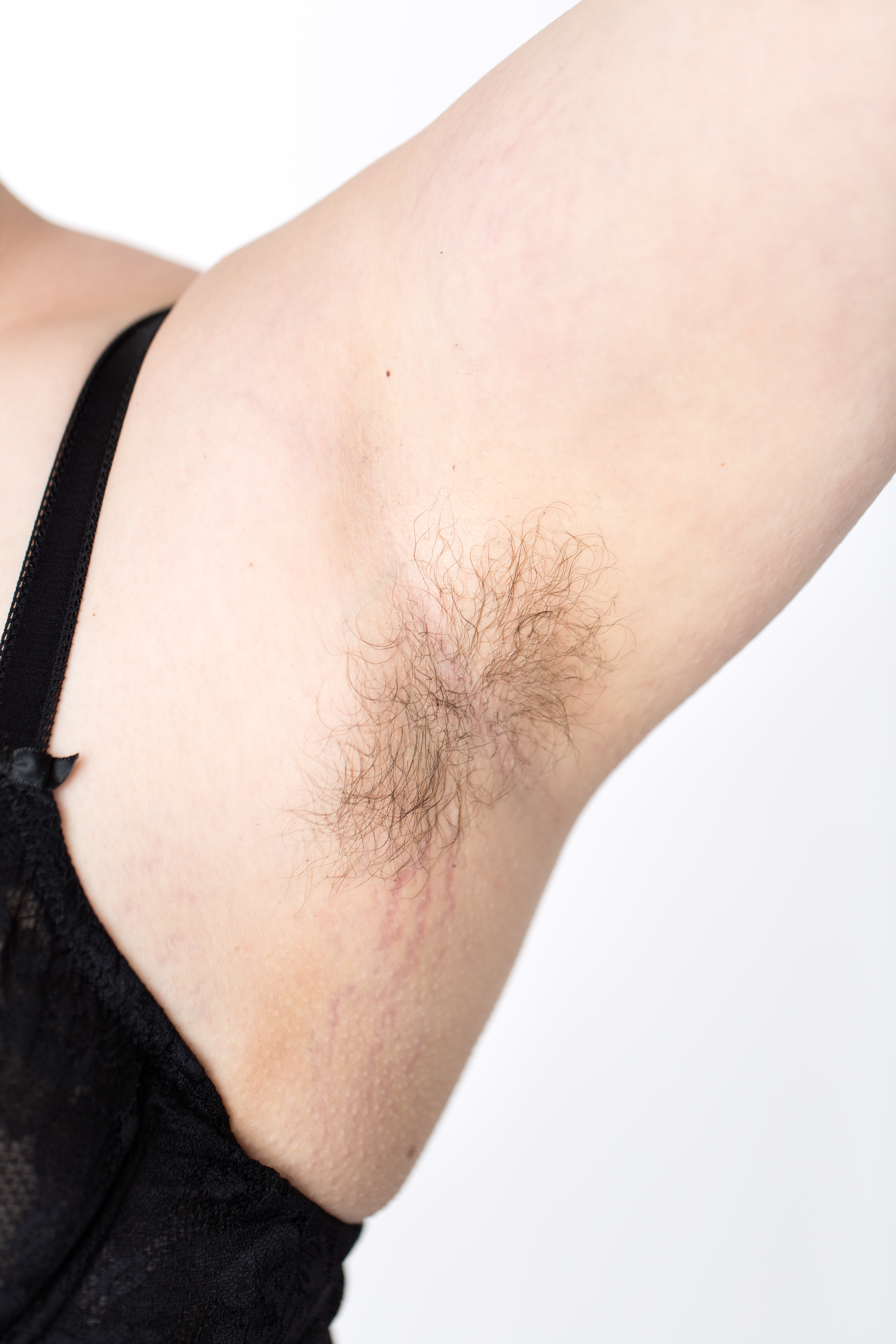
Normal underarm

An adolescent boy’s armpit, unshaven age 13

== Clinical significance ==
Like other flexion surfaces of large joints (groin, popliteal fossa, cubital fossa and essentially the anterior part of the neck), it is an area where blood vessels and nerves pass relatively superficially, and with an increased amount of lymph nodes.

=== Lymphogenic spread of breast cancer ===
Breast cancer typically spreads via lymphatic vessels to the lymph nodes found in the axilla.

=== Axillary intertrigo ===
Excessive perspiration without adequate air circulation can result in axillary intertrigo. Intertrigo is an inflammatory skin condition of skin folds exposed to friction or maceration in the presence of heat and moisture. Intertrigo is worsened by infection, usually fungal (Candida yeast species), but also bacterial or viral; warm, wet underarms promote those growths. The condition results in rash-like symptoms, pustules, or chronic itching or burning in the underarm. Intertrigo (in any site) has no racial or sexual predilection. Axillary intertrigo is common among those who work in hot environments where air circulation is restricted by necessary clothing or safety equipment.

== See also ==
- Deodorant
- Perspiration
- Popliteal fossa or "knee pit"
- Suspensory ligament of axilla
