= Inferior lateral cutaneous nerve of arm =

Nerve in humans and other animals

- The cutaneous innervation of the right upper limb, with Inf. lat. cut. labeled at right.

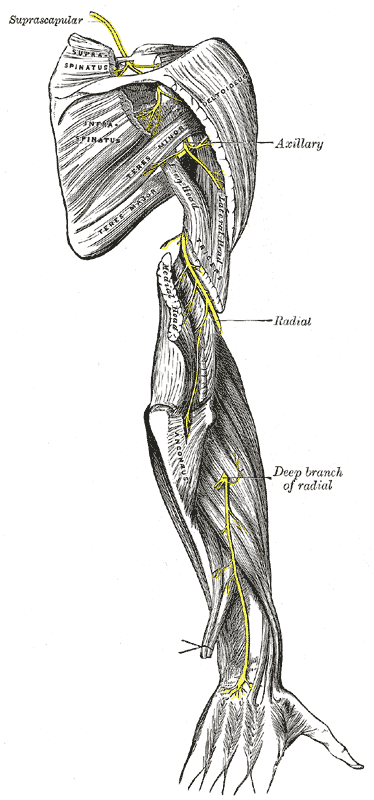
- The suprascapular, axillary, and radial nerves. (Inferior lateral cutaneous nerve of the arm not labeled, but cutaneous innervation would occur on the surface near the word 'radial' at upper left.)

Details
- From: radial nerve

Identifiers
- Latin: nervus cutaneus brachii lateralis inferior
- TA98: A14.2.03.051
- TA2: 6433
- FMA: 44949

The inferior lateral cutaneous nerve of arm is a nerve found in humans and other animals. It is also called the inferior lateral brachial cutaneous nerve. It is a branch of the radial nerve that provides sensory and vasomotor innervation to the lower, lateral aspect of the arm.

== See also ==
- Superior lateral cutaneous nerve of arm (a branch of the axillary nerve)
- Lateral cutaneous nerve of forearm (a continuation of the musculocutaneous nerve)
- Posterior cutaneous nerve of arm (another branch of the radial nerve)
