= Posterior cutaneous nerve of arm =

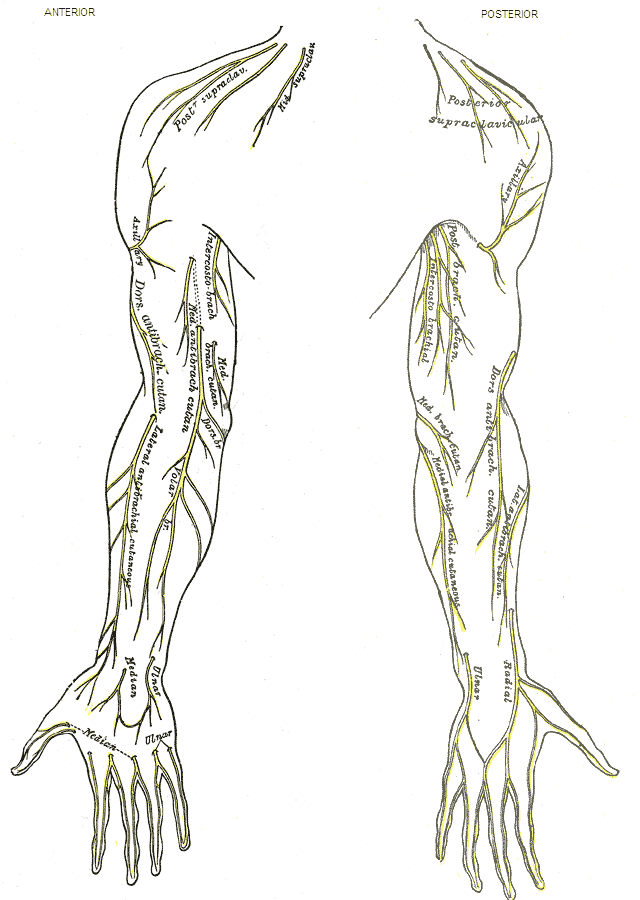
- Cutaneous nerves of right upper extremity. ("Post. brach. cutan." visible at center left.)

Details
- From: Radial nerve

Identifiers
- Latin: nervus cutaneus brachii posterior
- TA98: A14.2.03.050
- TA2: 6432
- FMA: 44948

The posterior cutaneous nerve of arm (internal cutaneous branch of musculospiral, posterior brachial cutaneous nerve) is a branch of the radial nerve that provides sensory innervation for much of the skin on the back of the arm. It arises in the axilla.

It is of small size, and passes through the axilla to the medial side of the area supplying the skin on its dorsal surface nearly as far as the olecranon.

In its course it crosses behind and communicates with the intercostobrachial.

== See also ==
- Superior lateral cutaneous nerve of arm
- Inferior lateral cutaneous nerve of arm
- Medial cutaneous nerve of arm
- Posterior cutaneous nerve of forearm

== Additional images ==
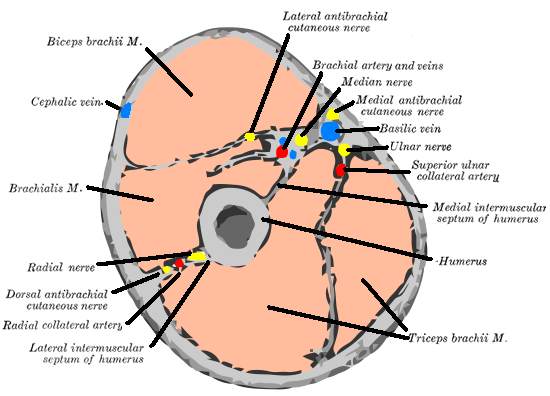
Cross-section through the middle of upper arm.

Diagram of segmental distribution of the cutaneous nerves of the right upper extremity.
