= Posterior cutaneous nerve of forearm =

- Diagram of segmental distribution of the cutaneous nerves of the right upper extremity. Posterior view. ("post. antebrach. cutan." visible in red at right.)

Details
- From: Radial nerve

Identifiers
- Latin: nervus cutaneus antebrachii posterior, nervus cutaneus antibrachii dorsalis
- TA98: A14.2.03.052
- TA2: 6434
- FMA: 39145

The posterior cutaneous nerve of forearm is a nerve found in humans and other animals. It is also known as the dorsal antebrachial cutaneous nerve, the external cutaneous branch of the musculospiral nerve, and the posterior antebrachial cutaneous nerve. It is a cutaneous nerve (a nerve that supplies skin) of the forearm.

== Origin ==
It arises from the radial nerve in the posterior compartment of the arm, often along with the posterior cutaneous nerve of the arm.

== Course ==
It perforates the lateral head of the triceps brachii muscle at the triceps' attachment to the humerus.

The upper and smaller branch of the nerve passes to the front of the elbow, lying close to the cephalic vein, and supplies the skin of the lower half of the arm.

The lower branch pierces the deep fascia below the insertion of the deltoideus, and descends along the lateral side of the arm and elbow, and then along the back of the forearm to the wrist, supplying the skin in its course, and joining, near its termination, with the dorsal branch of the lateral antebrachial cutaneous nerve.

== See also ==
- Medial cutaneous nerve of forearm
- Lateral cutaneous nerve of forearm
- Posterior cutaneous nerve of arm

== Additional images ==
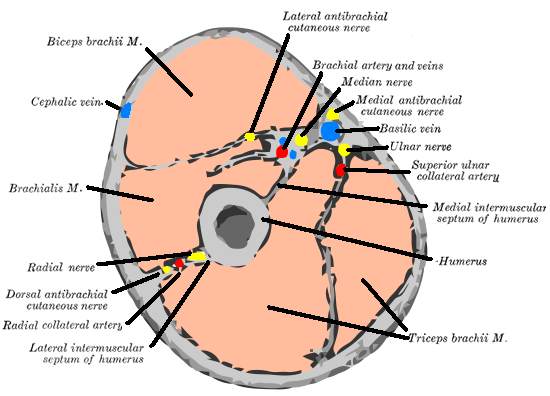
Cross-section through the middle of upper arm.

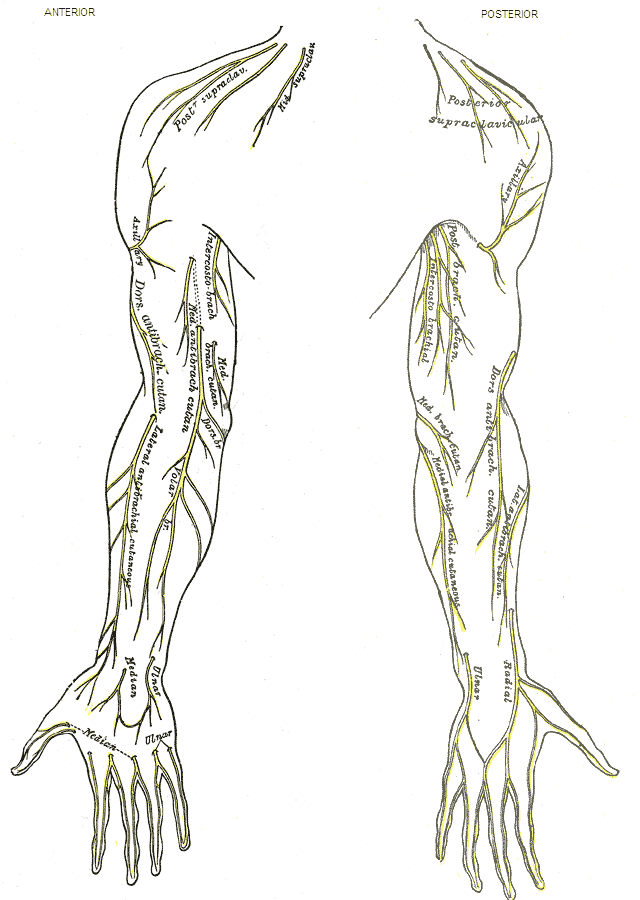
Cutaneous nerves of right upper extremity.
