= Superior lateral cutaneous nerve of arm =

Nerve

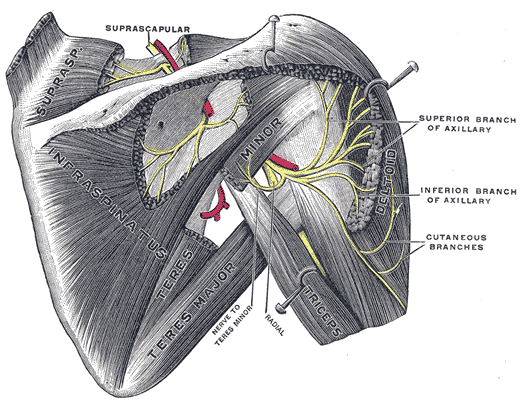
- Suprascapular and axillary nerves of right side, seen from behind.

- Cutenaous innervation of the arm. Innervation area of Axillary, sup. lat. cut. (C5-C6) is seen in blue at top.

Details
- From: axillary nerve

Identifiers
- Latin: nervus cutaneus brachii lateralis superior
- TA98: A14.2.03.061
- TA2: 6442
- FMA: 65303

The superior lateral cutaneous nerve of arm (or superior lateral brachial cutaneous nerve) is the continuation of the posterior branch of the axillary nerve, after it pierces the deep fascia. It contains axons from C5-C6 ventral rami.

== Structure ==
It sweeps around the posterior border of the deltoideus and supplies the skin over the lower two-thirds of the posterior part of this muscle, as well as that covering the long head of the triceps brachii.

== See also ==
- Posterior cutaneous nerve of arm (Posterior brachial)
- Medial cutaneous nerve of arm (Medial brachial)
- Lateral cutaneous nerve of forearm (Lateral antebrachial)

== Additional images ==
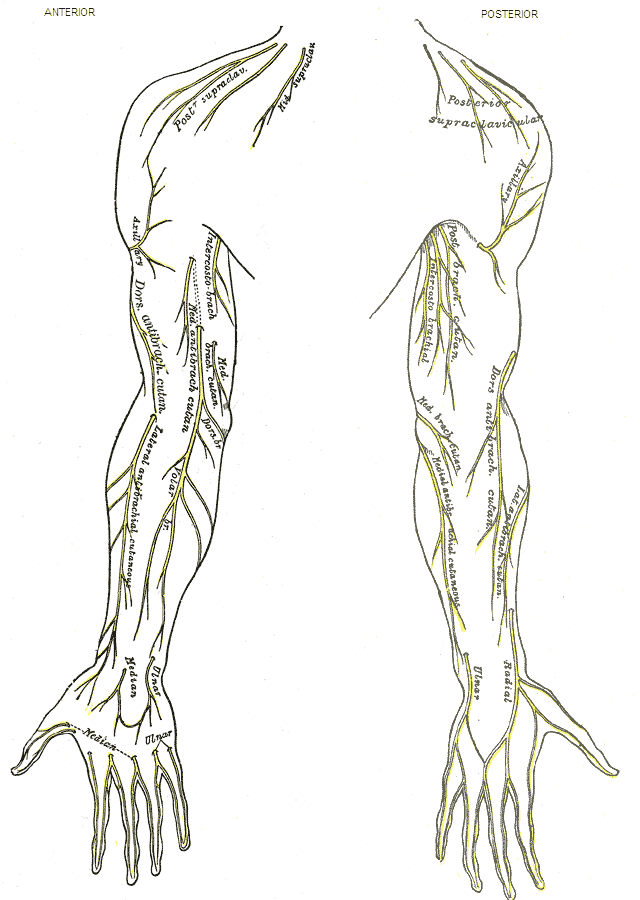
Cutaneous nerves of right upper extremity.

Diagram of segmental distribution of the cutaneous nerves of the right upper extremity.
