= Lateral cutaneous nerve of forearm =

Type of sensory nerve

- Diagram of segmental distribution of the cutaneous nerves of the right upper extremity. Anterior view. ("Lat. antebrach. cutan." visible in purple.)

Details
- From: Musculocutaneous nerve

Identifiers
- Latin: nervus cutaneus antebrachii lateralis
- TA98: A14.2.03.026
- TA2: 6423
- FMA: 39080

The lateral cutaneous nerve of forearm (or lateral antebrachial cutaneous nerve) is a sensory nerve representing the continuation of the musculocutaneous nerve beyond the lateral edge of the tendon of the biceps brachii muscle. The lateral cutaneous nerve provides sensory innervation to the skin of the lateral forearm. It pierces the deep fascia of forearm to enter the subcutaneous compartment before splitting into a volar branch and a dorsal branch.

== Anatomy ==
=== Course and relations ===
It passes behind the cephalic vein and divides opposite the elbow-joint into a volar branch and a dorsal branch.

=== Branches ===
==== Volar branch ====
The volar branch (ramus volaris; anterior branch) descends along the radial border of the forearm to the wrist, and supplies the skin over the lateral half of its volar surface.

At the wrist-joint it is placed in front of the radial artery, and some filaments, piercing the deep fascia, accompany that vessel to the dorsal surface of the carpus.

The nerve then passes downward to the ball of the thumb, where it ends in cutaneous filaments.

It communicates with the superficial branch of the radial nerve, and with the palmar cutaneous branch of the median nerve.

==== Dorsal branch ====
The dorsal branch (ramus dorsalis; posterior branch) descends, along the dorsal surface of the radial side of the forearm to the wrist.

It supplies the skin of the lower two-thirds of the dorso-lateral surface of the forearm, communicating with the superficial branch of the radial nerve and the posterior cutaneous nerve of forearm of the radial nerve.

== See also ==
- Medial cutaneous nerve of forearm
- Superior lateral cutaneous nerve of arm

== Additional images ==
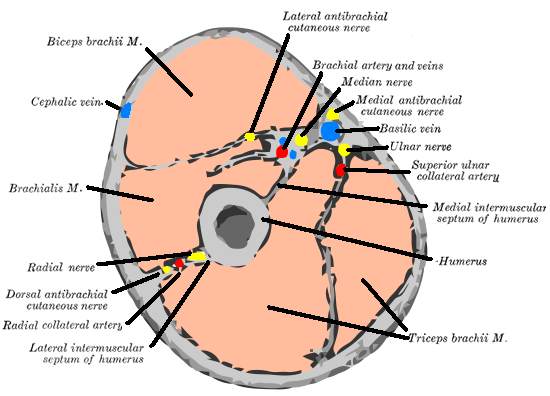
Cross-section through the middle of upper arm.

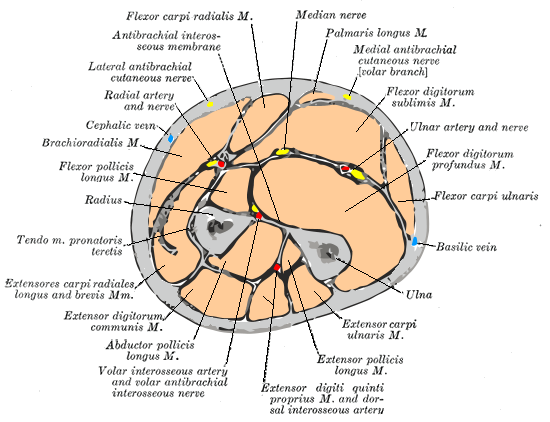
Cross-section through the middle of the forearm.
