= Posterior branches of cervical nerves =

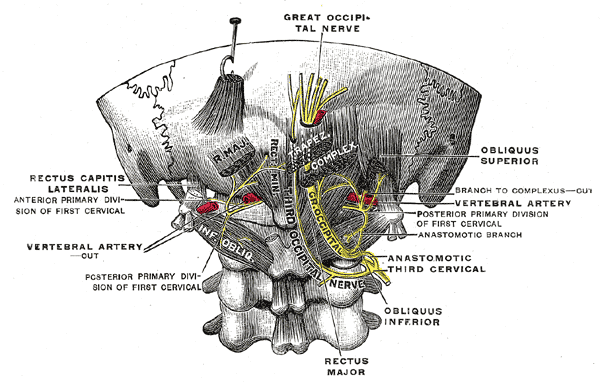
- Posterior primary divisions of the upper three cervical nerves.

Details
- From: cervical nerves

Identifiers
- Latin: rami posteriores nervorum cervicalium

The posterior branches of cervical nerves branch from the dorsal rami of the cervical nerves.

== Branches ==
=== First ===
The posterior division of the first cervical or suboccipital nerve is larger than the anterior division, and emerges above the posterior arch of the atlas and beneath the vertebral artery. It enters the suboccipital triangle and supplies the muscles which bound this triangle, viz., the Rectus capitis posterior major, and the Obliquus capitis superior and Obliquus capitis inferior; it gives branches also to the Rectus capitis posterior minor and the Semispinalis capitis. A filament from the branch to the Obliquus capitis inferior joins the posterior division of the second cervical nerve.

The nerve occasionally gives off a cutaneous branch which accompanies the occipital artery to the scalp, and communicates with the greater and lesser occipital nerves.

=== Second ===
The posterior division of the second cervical nerve is much larger than the anterior division, and is the greatest of all the cervical posterior divisions. It emerges between the posterior arch of the atlas and the lamina of the axis, below the Obliquus capitis inferior. It supplies a twig to this muscle, receives a communicating filament from the posterior division of the first cervical, and then divides into a large medial and a small lateral branch.

- The medial branch (ramus medialis; internal branch), called from its size and distribution the greater occipital nerve, ascends obliquely between the Obliquus capitis inferior and the Semispinalis capitis, and pierces the latter muscle and the Trapezius near their attachments to the occipital bone. It is then joined by a filament from the medial branch of the posterior division of the third cervical, and, ascending on the back of the head with the occipital artery, divides into branches which communicate with the lesser occipital nerve and supply the skin of the scalp as far forward as the vertex of the skull. It gives off muscular branches to the Semispinalis capitis, and occasionally a twig to the back of the auricula.
- The lateral branch (ramus lateralis; external branch) supplies filaments to the Splenius, Longissimus capitis, and Semispinalis capitis, and is often joined by the corresponding branch of the third cervical.

=== Third ===
The posterior division of the third cervical is intermediate in size between those of the second and fourth.

- Its medial branch runs between the Semispinalis capitis and cervicis, and, piercing the Splenius and Trapezius, ends in the skin. While under the Trapezius it gives off a branch called the third occipital nerve, which pierces the Trapezius and ends in the skin of the lower part of the back of the head. It lies medial to the greater occipital and communicates with it.
- The lateral branch often joins that of the second cervical.

The posterior division of the suboccipital, and the medial branches of the posterior division of the second and third cervical nerves are sometimes joined by communicating loops to form the posterior cervical plexus.

=== Fourth through eighth ===
The posterior divisions of the lower five cervical nerves divide into medial and lateral branches.

- The medial branches of the fourth and fifth run between the Semispinales cervicis and capitis, and, having reached the spinous processes, pierce the Splenius and Trapezius to end in the skin. Sometimes the branch of the fifth fails to reach the skin. Those of the lower three nerves are small, and end in the Semispinalis cervicis and capitis, Multifidus, and Interspinales.
- The lateral branches of the lower five nerves supply the Iliocostalis cervicis, Longissimus cervicis, and Longissimus capitis.

== Additional images ==
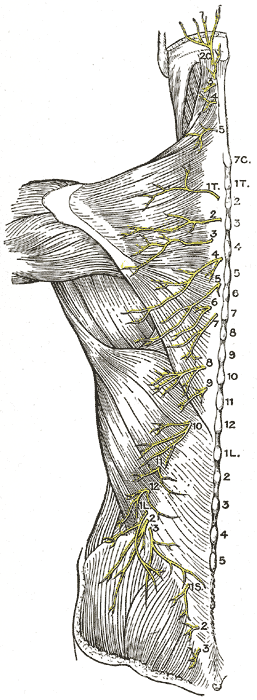
Diagram of the distribution of the cutaneous branches of the posterior divisions of the spinal nerves.

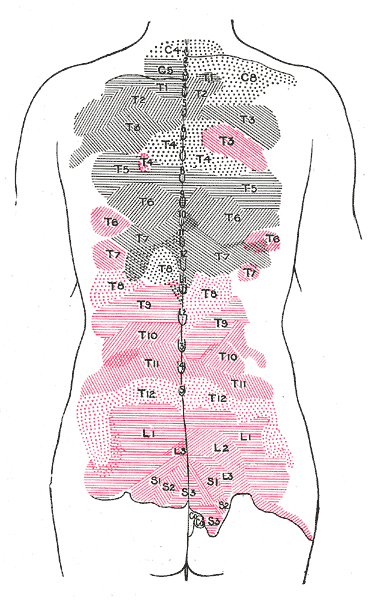
Areas of distribution of the cutaneous branches of the posterior divisions of the spinal nerves.
