= Myodural bridge =

Anatomical structure

The myodural bridge or miodural ligament is a bridge of connective tissue that extends between the suboccipital muscles and the cervical spinal dura mater, the outer membrane that envelops the spinal cord. It provides a physical connection between the musculoskeletal and nervous systems, and the circulation of cerebrospinal fluid. Its importance has been highlighted by various authors.

The myodural bridge is mainly formed by muscular and tendinous components. This bridge originates in the deep layers of the suboccipital muscles, specifically in the rectus capitis posterior minor muscle, and extends to join the dura mater of the cervical spinal cord. This structural connection forms a continuous link from the base of the skull to the top of the cervical spine. Recent studies postulate the existence and functional importance of the myodural bridge in mammals.

This membranous anatomical structure was discovered in the mid-90s. According to forensic studies conducted, this ligament has various patterns of insertion although the general consensus is that it primarily adheres to the occipital bone, to the rectus capitis posterior minor muscle, to the posterior arch of the atlas bone, and to the dura mater. The term "Miodural Bridge Complex" postulates it as a new functional structure.

It is a relevant anatomical structure due to its role in the biomechanics and physiology of the human body.

== Physiological functions ==
Among its physiological functions are the biomechanical stabilization of the atlantooccipital joint and the dura mater, the regulation of cerebrospinal fluid, mediation in nociceptive transduction, monitoring of dura mater tension, and sensorimotor regulation in the cervical region (coordination of movements and sensory perception). The myodural bridge is also involved in proprioceptive transmission, preventing obstructions of the subarachnoid space and the cerebromedullary cistern.

== Pathophysiology and clinical relevance ==
The myodural bridge displays physiological reciprocities with the suboccipital muscles, which include the inferior oblique capitis (OCI), the rectus capitis posterior major (RCPM), and the rectus capitis posterior minor (RCPm), in addition to the posterior atlanto-occipital membrane and several meningo-vertebral structures. This may lead the myodural bridge to exert torque, traction, or shortening on the dura mater, creating abnormal tension that can result in head protrusion, headaches, and vertigo of cervicogenic origin. Pathomechanical or physiological abnormalities of the myodural bridge can affect the blood volume in the suboccipital cavernous sinuses, leading to cognitive disorders associated with cerebrospinal fluid (CSF) dysfunctions. It has also been proposed as an etiological factor in the symptoms associated with Arnold-Chiari type I disease.

The role of the posterior cervical musculature in sensorimotor control, cervicocephalic pain, and spinal cord stabilization goes through biomechanical and anatomical interactions with the miodural bridge. There are soft tissue anatomical connections that cross the cervical epidural space and link the suboccipital muscle fascia with the dura mater. The myodural bridge provides both passive and active anchoring to the spinal cord. It is also involved in the dura mater tension monitoring system to prevent dural folds and maintain the permeability of the spinal cord. Modulation of dura mater tension can be initiated through a sensory reflex to the contractile muscle tissues. Unanticipated movements, such as hyperflexion-extension injuries, stimulate the deep suboccipital muscles and transmit traction forces through the miodural bridge to the cervical dura mater.
