= Suboccipital =

Suboccipital can refer to:

- Suboccipital nerve
- Suboccipital triangle
- Suboccipital muscles
