= Obliquus capitis muscle =

Obliquus capitis muscle may refer to:

- Obliquus capitis superior muscle
- Obliquus capitis inferior muscle
