= Rectus capitis =

Rectus capitis may refer to:

- Rectus capitis anterior muscle
- Rectus capitis lateralis muscle
- Rectus capitis posterior major muscle
- Rectus capitis posterior minor muscle
