= Posterior atlantooccipital membrane =

Membrane at the base of the skull

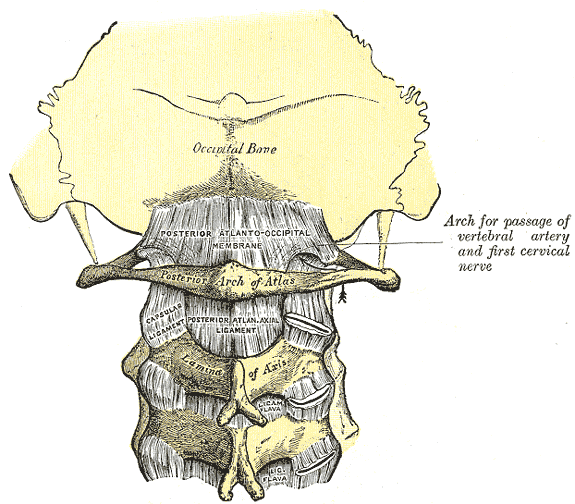
- Posterior atlantooccipital membrane and atlantoaxial ligament. (Posterior atlantooccipital membrane is topmost gray region at center.)

Details

Identifiers
- Latin: membrana atlantooccipitalis posterior
- TA98: A03.1.08.004
- TA2: 1633
- FMA: 25006

The posterior atlantooccipital membrane (posterior atlantooccipital ligament) is a broad but thin membrane extending between the posterior margin of the foramen magnum above, and posterior arch of atlas (first cervical vertebra) below. It forms the floor of the suboccipital triangle.

The membrane helps limit excessive movement of the atlanto-occipital joints.

== Anatomy ==
=== Attachments ===
The superior attachment of the membrane at the posterior margin of the foramen magnum, and its inferior attachment is at the superior margin of the posterior arch of atlas (cervical vertebra C1).

The membrane additionally attaches posteriorly (by a soft tissue bridge which may contain muscle or tendon fibres) to the recti capitis posteriores minores mucles, and anteriorly to the dura mater.

=== Innervation ===
The membrane is innervated by the spinal nerve C1.

=== Relations ===
At either lateral extremity, the membrane is pierced by the vertebral artery and cervical spinal nerve C1. The free border of the membrane arches over the artery and nerve, and is sometimes ossified (converting the passage for the vertebral artery into a foramen).

Laterally, the membrane blends with the articular capsules.

It is superficial/anterior to the dura mater of the spinal canal (onto which it attaches). The membrane overlies the grooves for vertebral arteries, vertebral venous plexuses, and cervical spinal nerves C1.

The membrane forms the floor of the suboccipital triangle. It is deep to the recti capitis posteriores minores mucles (which attach onto the membrane), and the obliqui capitis superiores muscles.

== Clinical significance ==
The membrane may be pierced with a needle at the midline superior to the arch of atlas to access the cisterna magna.

== Research ==
In 2015, Scali et al. revisited the anatomy of the posterior atlantooccipital membrane via plastination. Their findings revealed that the PAO membrane superiorly consisted of periosteum of the occiput, whereas inferiorly it formed part of the dura at the cerebrospinal junction, terminating at the level of the third cervical vertebra (rather than attaching to the posterior arch of the atlas). It is believed that this anatomical arrangement permits a superiorly located anchor point for epidural bridging structures and allows dural tensile forces to act in a summated synchronized manner. The author's hypothesize that this complex area assists with outflow of cerebrospinal fluid.

== See also ==
- Anterior atlantooccipital membrane

== Additional images ==
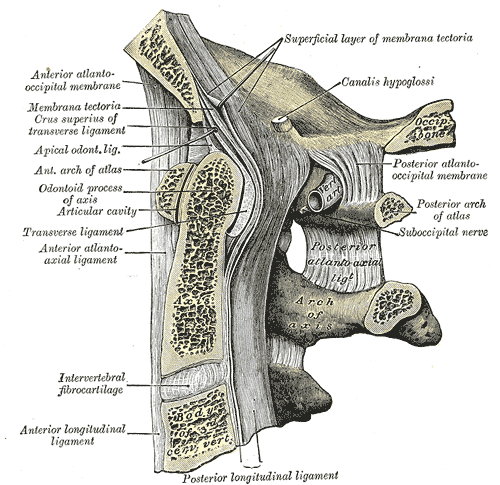
Median sagittal section through the occipital bone and first three cervical vertebræ.
