= Rectus capitis posterior muscle =

Rectus capitis posterior muscle may refer to:

- Rectus capitis posterior minor muscle
- Rectus capitis posterior major muscle
