= Ramus of spinal nerve =

Ramus of spinal nerve may refer to:

- Anterior ramus of spinal nerve
- Posterior ramus of spinal nerve
