= Human head =

Upper portion of the human body

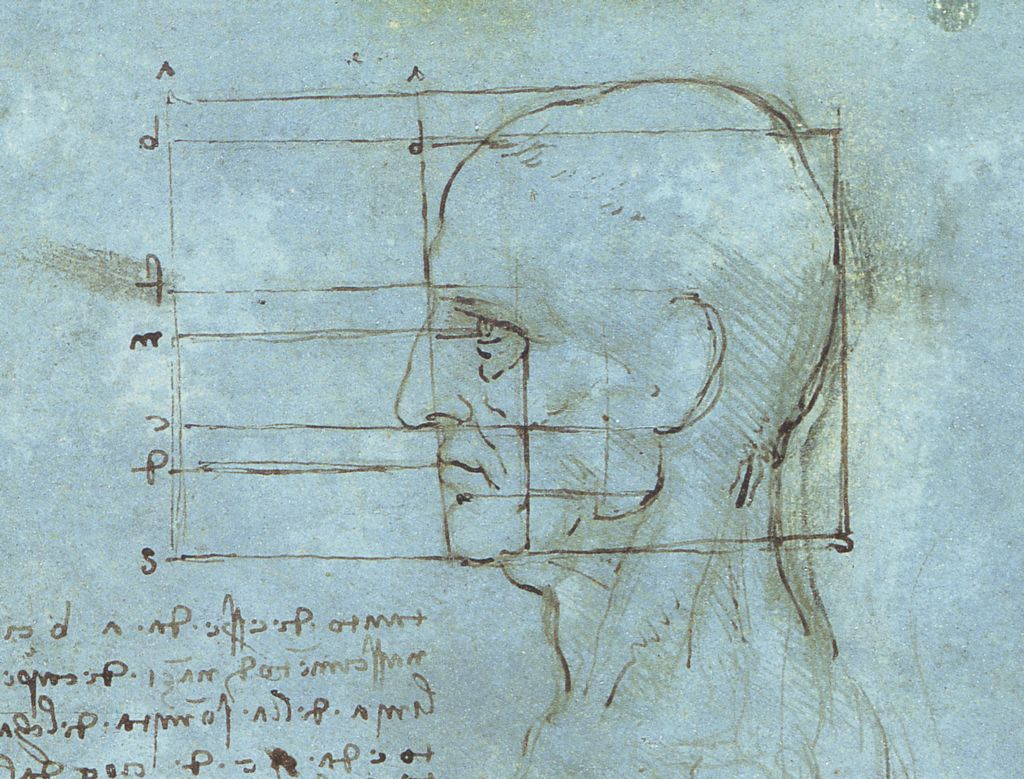
- The human head illustrated by Leonardo da Vinci

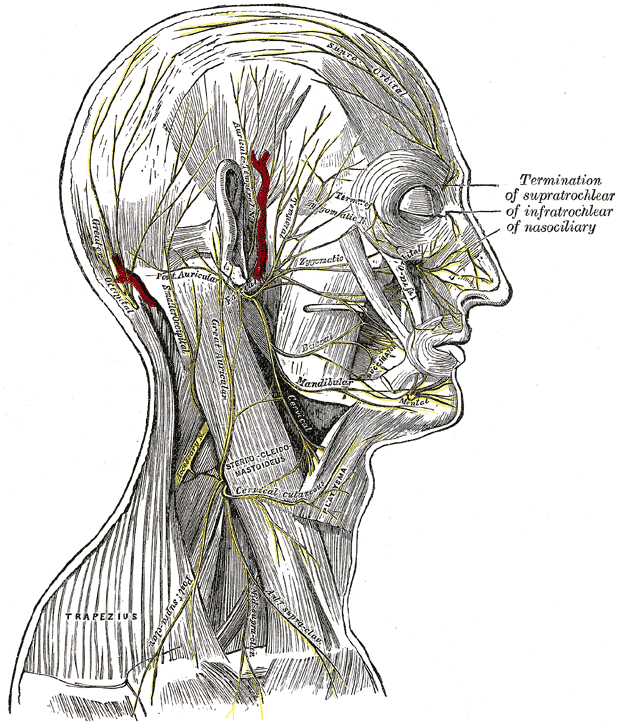
- A dextral view of the human neck and head, with the tegument removed, revealing muscles

Details

Identifiers
- Latin: caput
- MeSH: D006257
- TA98: A01.1.00.001
- TA2: 98
- FMA: 7154

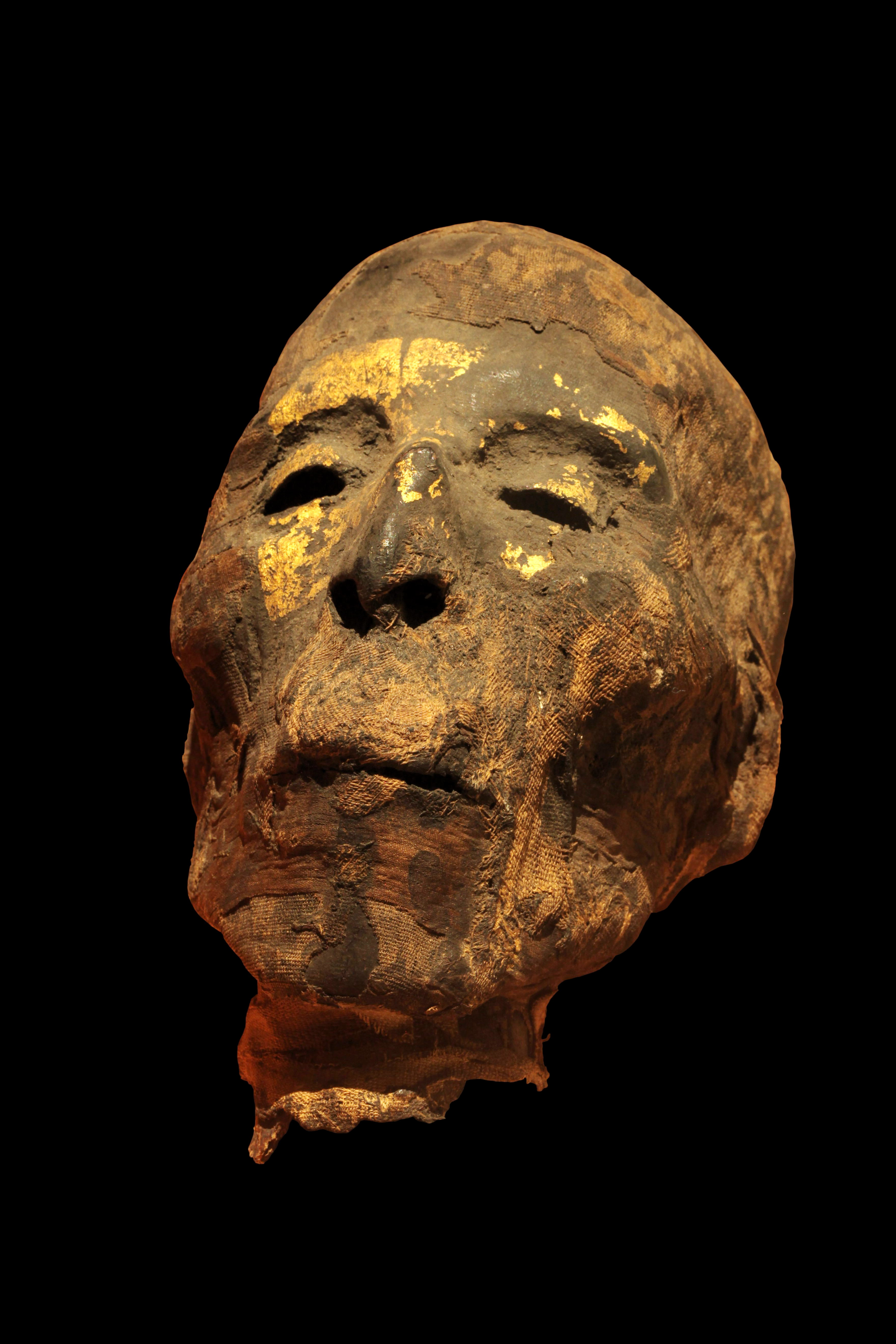
Human head

In human anatomy, the head is the uppermost part of the body, attached to the torso by the neck. It houses the brain, forming the cranial cavity for protection and support through the skull, which also forms the orbits and nasal cavity. The sensory organs and the mouth are part of the head. The face, except for the exposed sensory organs, is wrapped by tegument (skin, hair on the majority of the surface). Numerous skeletal muscles, as well as mobile articulations in the neck, grant the head mobility.

== Structure ==
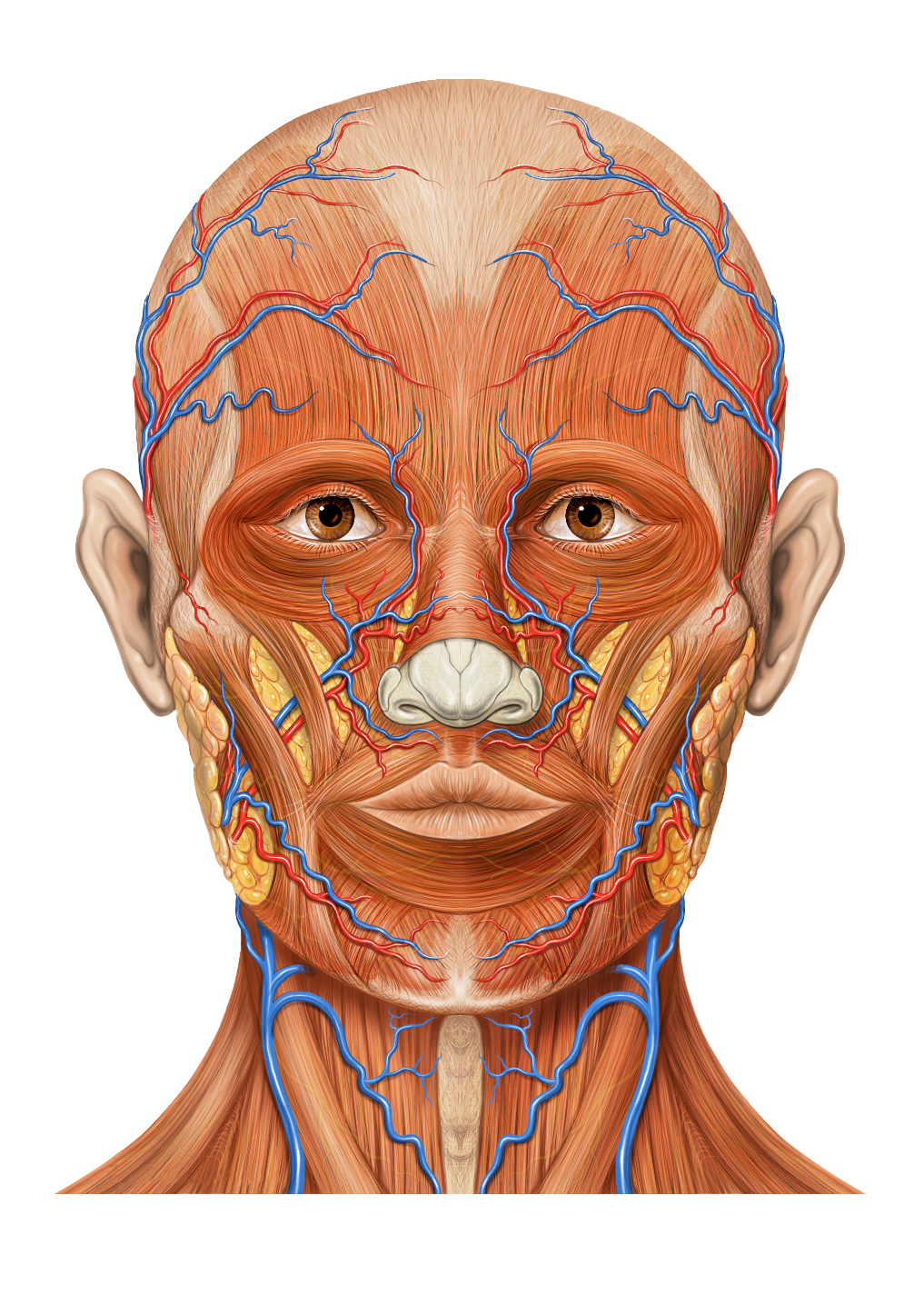
Anatomy of the human head

The human head consists of a fleshy outer portion, which surrounds the bony skull. The brain is enclosed within the skull. There are 22 bones in the human head. The head rests on the neck, and the seven cervical vertebrae support it. The human head typically weighs between 2.3 and 5 kilograms (5.1 and 11.0 lb). Over 98% of humans fit into this range. There have been odd incidences where human beings have abnormally small or large heads. The Zika virus was responsible for underdeveloped heads in 2015 and 2016.

The face is the anterior part of the head, containing the eyes, nose, and mouth. On either side of the mouth, the cheeks provide a fleshy border to the oral cavity. The ears sit to either side of the head.

=== Blood supply ===
The head receives blood supply through the internal and external carotid arteries. These supply the area outside of the skull (external carotid artery) and inside of the skull (internal carotid artery). The area inside the skull also receives blood supply from the vertebral arteries, which travel up through the transverse foramina of cervical vertebrae.

=== Nerve supply ===
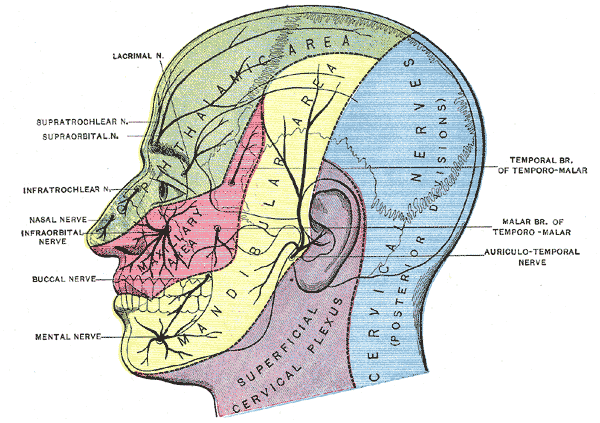
Sensory areas of the head, showing the general distribution of the three divisions of the fifth nerve. From Gray's Anatomy 1918

The twelve pairs of cranial nerves provide the majority of nervous control to the head. Innervation to the muscles of the face, which allow one to do actions like smile or grimace, is primarily provided by the facial nerve, the seventh cranial nerve. The sensation to the face is provided by the branches of the trigeminal nerve, the fifth cranial nerve. Sensation to other portions of the head is provided by the cervical nerves.

Modern texts are in agreement about which areas of the skin are served by which nerves, but there are minor variations in some of the details. The borders designated by diagrams in the 1918 edition of Gray's Anatomy are similar but not identical to those generally accepted today.

The cutaneous innervation of the head is as follows:

- Ophthalmic nerve (green)
- Maxillary nerve (pink)
- Mandibular nerve (yellow)
- Cervical plexus (purple)
- Dorsal rami of cervical nerves (blue) and others are in picture which show following in upper column

== Function ==
The head contains sensory organs: two eyes, two ears, a nose and tongue inside of the mouth. It also houses the brain. Together, these organs function as a processing center for the body by relaying sensory information to the brain. Humans can process information faster by having this central nerve cluster. The special senses of Olfaction, vision, taste, hearing and vestibular function are encoded by highly specialized sense organs and transmitted to the brain via cranial nerves.

Structurally on the interior, the skull protects the brain and supports the facial region, while the jaw and oral cavity enable chewing, speech articulation, and the initial stages of digestion.

== Society and culture ==
For humans, the front of the head (the face) is the main distinguishing feature between different people due to its easily discernible features, such as eye and hair colors, shapes of the sensory organs, and the wrinkles. Humans easily differentiate between faces because of the brain's predisposition toward facial recognition. When observing a relatively unfamiliar species, all faces seem nearly identical. Human infants are biologically programmed to recognize subtle differences in anthropomorphic facial features.

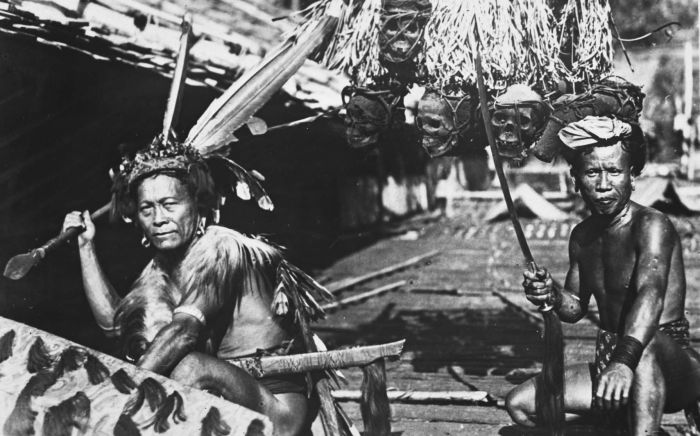
Dayak people were feared for their headhunting practices

People who have greater than average intelligence are sometimes depicted in cartoons as having bigger heads as a way of notionally indicating that they have a "larger head". Additionally, in science fiction, an extraterrestrial having a big head is often symbolic of high intelligence. Despite this depiction, advances in neurobiology have shown that the functional diversity of the brain means that a difference in overall brain size is only slightly to moderately correlated to differences in overall intelligence between two humans.

The head is a source for many metaphors and metonymies in human language, including referring to things typically near the human head ( "the head of the bed"), things physically similar to the way a head is arranged spatially to a body ("the head of the table"), metaphorically ("the head of the class"), and things that represent some characteristics associated with the head, such as intelligence ("there are a lot of good heads in this company").

Ancient Greeks had a method for evaluating sexual attractiveness based on the Golden ratio, part of which included measurements of the head.

Headhunting is the practice of taking and preserving a person's head after killing the person. Headhunting has been practiced across the Americas, Europe, Asia, and Oceania for millennia.

=== Clothing ===
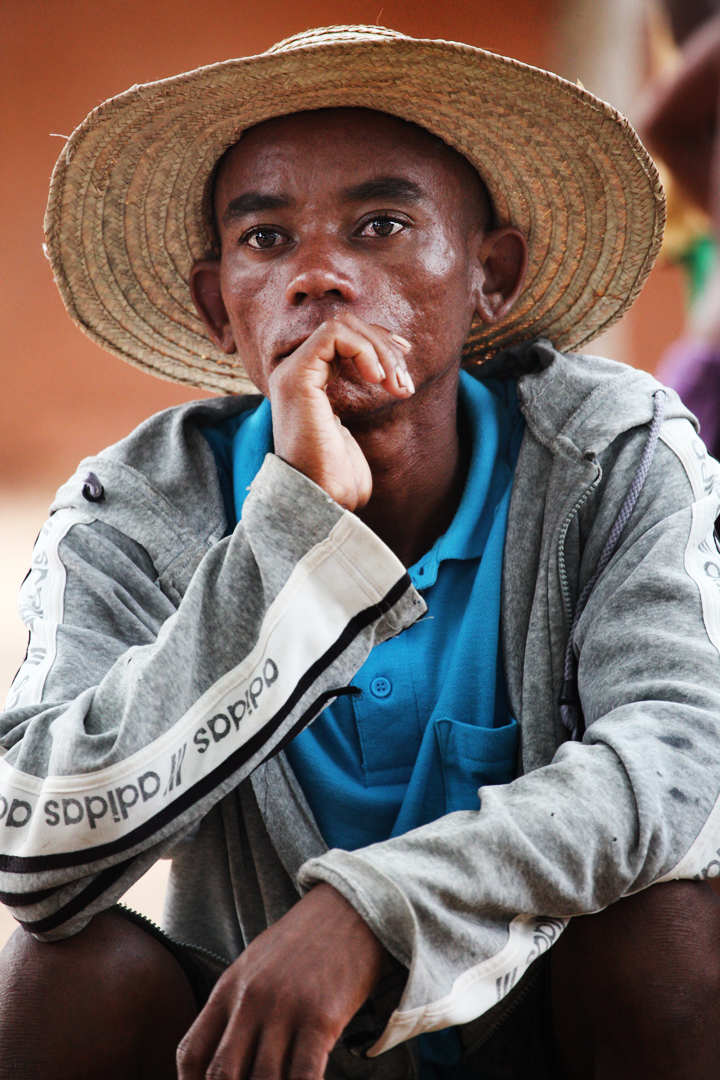
A man wearing a straw hat

Headpieces can signify status, origin, religious/spiritual beliefs, social grouping, team affiliation, occupation, or fashion choices.

In many cultures, covering the head is seen as a sign of respect. Often, some or all of the head must be covered and veiled when entering holy places or places of prayer. For many centuries, women in Europe, the Middle East, and South Asia have covered their head hair as a sign of modesty. This trend has changed drastically in Europe in the 20th century, although is still observed in other parts of the world. In addition, a number of religions require men to wear specific head clothing—such as the Islamic taqiyah, Jewish yarmulke, or the Sikh turban. The same goes for women with the Muslim hijab or Christian nun's habit.

A hat is a head covering that can serve a variety of purposes. Hats may be worn as part of a uniform or used as a protective device, such as a hard hat, a covering for warmth, a covering that meets sensory needs in some neurodivergent people, or a fashion accessory. Hats can also be indicative of social status in some areas of the world.

=== Anthropometry ===
While numerous charts detailing head sizes in infants and children exist, most do not measure average head circumference past the age of 21. Reference charts for adult head circumference also generally feature homogeneous samples and fail to take height and weight into account.

One study in the United States estimated the average human head circumference to be 57 centimetres (22 1/2 in) in males and 55 centimetres (21 3/4 in) in females. A British study by Newcastle University showed an average size of 57.2 cm for males and 55.2 cm for females with average size varying proportionally with height

Macrocephaly can be an indicator of increased risk for some types of cancer in individuals who carry the genetic mutation that causes Cowden syndrome. For adults, this refers to head sizes greater than 58 centimeters in men or greater than 57 centimeters in women.

== See also ==
- Human body
- Head and neck anatomy
- Heads in heraldry
