= Obliquus capitis inferior muscle =

Muscle of the neck

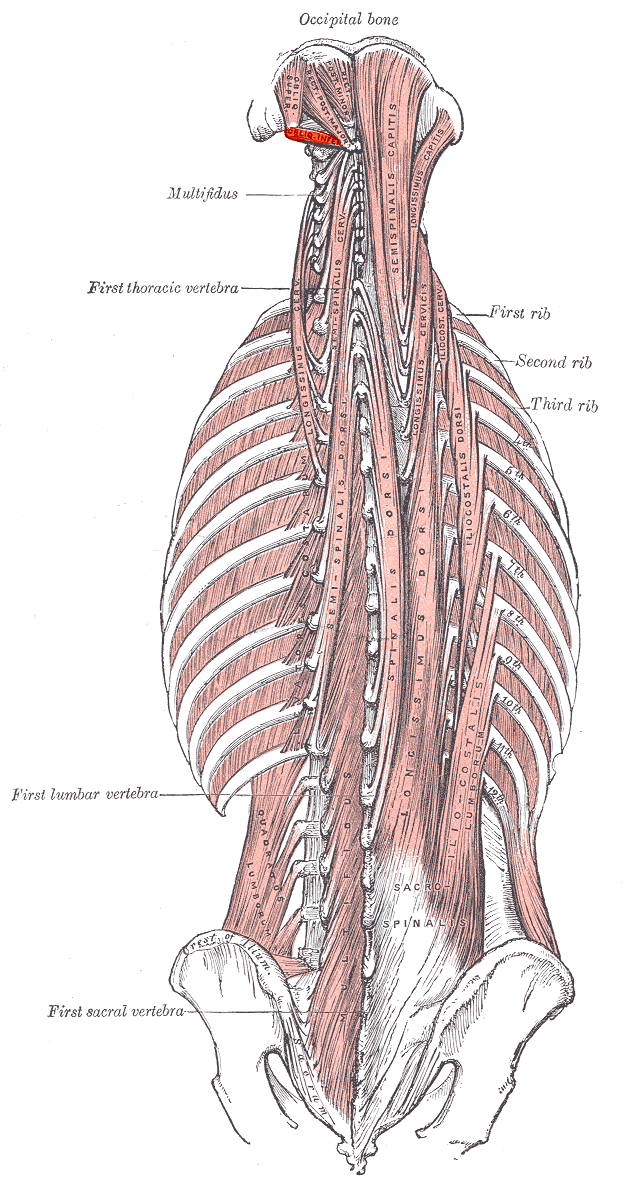
- Deep muscles of the back. (Obliq. infer. labeled at upper left.)

Details
- Origin: Spinous process of the axis
- Insertion: Lateral mass of atlas
- Nerve: Suboccipital nerve
- Actions: Rotation of head and neck

Identifiers
- Latin: musculus obliquus capitis inferior
- TA98: A04.2.02.007
- TA2: 2252
- FMA: 32528

The obliquus capitis inferior muscle (/əˈblaɪkwəs ˈkæpɪtɪs/) is a muscle in the upper back of the neck. It is one of the suboccipital muscles. Its inferior attachment is at the spinous process of the axis; its superior attachment is at the transverse process of the atlas. It is innervated by the suboccipital nerve (the posterior ramus of first cervical spinal nerve). The muscle rotates the head to its side.

Despite what its name suggest, it is the only capitis (Latin: "head") muscle that does not actually attach to the skull.

== Anatomy ==
The obliquus capitis inferior is one of the suboccipital muscles (and the only one of these to have no attachment to the skull). It is larger than the obliquus capitis superior muscle. It forms the inferolateral boundary of the suboccipital triangle.

The muscle extends laterally and somewhat superiorly from its inferior attachment to its superior attachment.

=== Attachments ===
The muscle originates inferiorly from the bifid apex of the spinous process of the axis (cervical vertebra C2) (inferior to the attachment of the rectus capitis posterior major muscle) and the lamina of the axis.

It is inserted superiorly into (the inferoposterior aspect of) the transverse process of the atlas (cervical vertebra C1).

=== Innervation ===
The muscle receives motor innervation from the suboccipital nerve (the posterior ramus of cervical spinal nerve C1).

=== Relations ===
It lies deep to the semispinalis capitis and trapezius muscles.

=== Actions/movements ===
The muscle acts to rotate the atlas (and thus the head) ipsilaterally. It acts together with the rectus capitis posterior major muscle.

== Function ==
The muscle is responsible for rotation of the head and first cervical vertebra (atlanto-axial joint).

The obliquus capitis inferior muscle, like the other suboccipital muscles, has an important role in proprioception. This muscle has a very high density of Golgi organs and muscle spindles which accounts for this. It is believed that proprioception may be the primary role of the inferior oblique (and indeed the other suboccipital muscles), allowing accurate positioning of the head on the neck.

== Additional images ==
Position of obliquus capitis inferior muscle (shown in red).

Close up. Vertebral column, occipital bone and obliquus capitis inferior muscle. The muscle arises from the apex of the spinous process of the axis and insert into the lower and back part of the transverse process of the atlas.

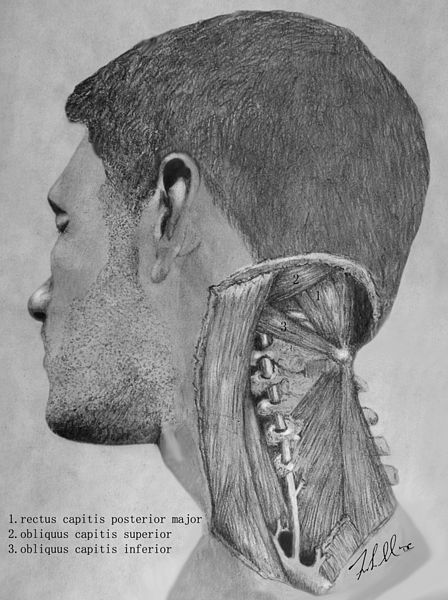
Obliquus capitis inferior's relationship to other suboccipital muscles.

== See also ==
Suboccipital muscles
