= Nuchal lines =

Part of the skull's occipital bone

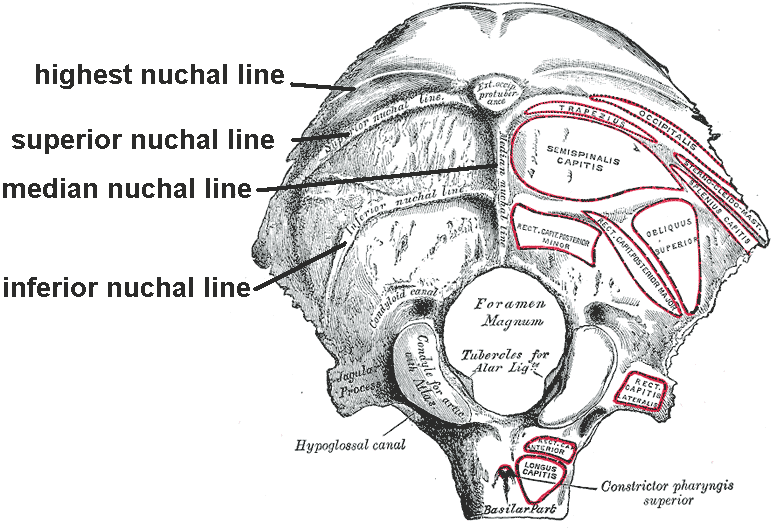
- Occipital bone. Outer surface.

- Side view of head, showing surface relations of bones. (Superior and median lines visible at bottom right.)

Details

Identifiers
- Latin: linea nuchae

The nuchal lines are four curved lines on the external surface of the occipital bone:

- The upper, often faintly marked, is named the highest nuchal line, but is sometimes referred to as the Mempin line or linea suprema, and it attaches to the epicranial aponeurosis.
- Below the highest nuchal line is the superior nuchal line. To it is attached, the splenius capitis muscle, the trapezius muscle, and the occipitalis.
- From the external occipital protuberance a ridge or crest, the external occipital crest also called the median nuchal line, often faintly marked, descends to the foramen magnum, and affords attachment to the nuchal ligament.
- Running from the middle of this line is the inferior nuchal line. Attached are the obliquus capitis superior muscle, rectus capitis posterior major muscle, and rectus capitis posterior minor muscle.

== Additional images ==
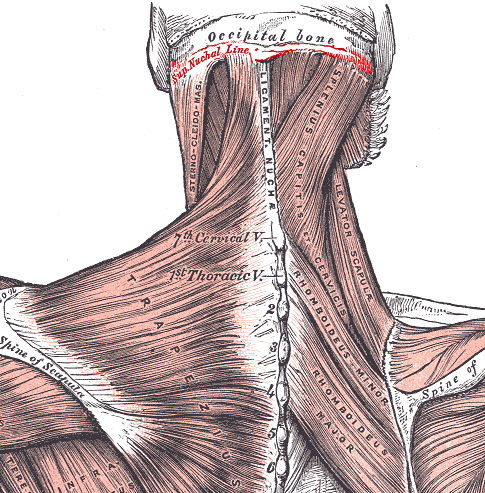
Posterior view of superior nuchal line (labeled in red) and muscles connecting to it.
