= Nunziante Ippolito =

Italian physician (1796–1851)

- Born: March 24, 1796; Naples
- Died: 1851 (aged 54–55); Naples
- Education: University of Naples
- Scientific career
- Fields: physician and anatomist

Nunziante Ippolito (Nunciante; 1796–1851) was an Italian medical doctor and anatomist. He studied in Naples and worked in one of the most important hospitals of the Reign of Two Sicilies and Europe, the Ospedale degli Incurabili. He worked also at Pellegrini hospital and at the University of Naples. Ippolito died in 1851.

Velpeau, who read an article, demonstrated that he was the first who used the ligature of the vertebral artery and indicated how to find it.

== Bibliography ==
- Sulla legatura dell'arteria vertebrale ne' casi di aneurismi e di ferite della stessa, Annali clinici dell'Ospedale degl'Incurabili, I [1835]
- Trattato di anatomia, 1842
- Una bizzarra anomalia delle parti sessuali, 1845
