= Atlanto-occipital joint =

Articulation between the occipital bone and the cervical atlas

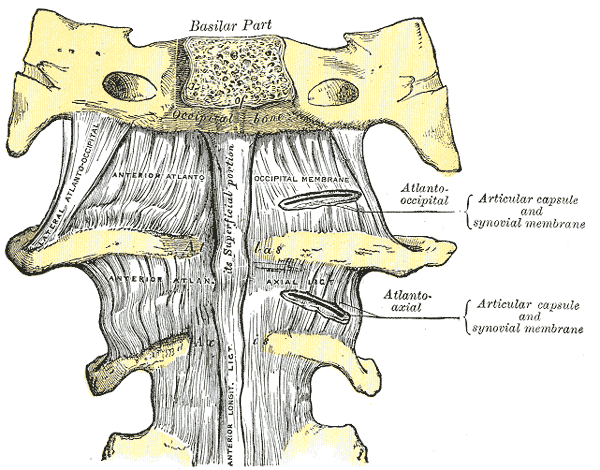
- Anterior atlanto-occipital membrane and atlantoaxial ligament.

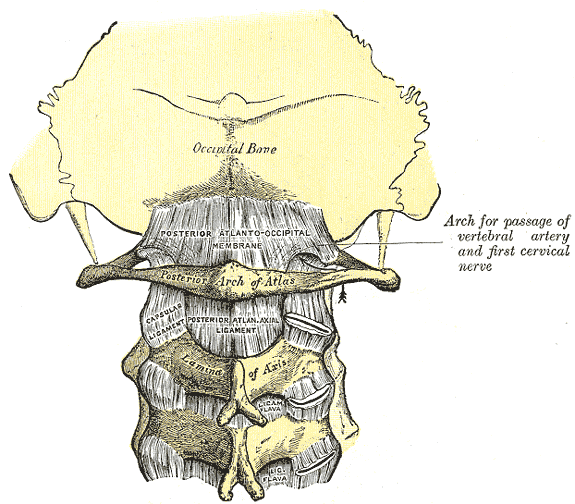
- Posterior atlanto-occipital membrane and atlantoaxial ligament.

Details
- System: Skeletal

Identifiers
- Latin: articulatio atlantooccipitalis
- MeSH: D001269
- TA98: A03.1.08.001
- TA2: 1630
- FMA: 24939

The atlanto-occipital joint (Articulatio atlantooccipitalis) is an articulation between the atlas bone and the occipital bone. It consists of a pair of condyloid joints. It is a synovial joint.

== Structure ==
The atlanto-occipital joint is an articulation between the atlas bone and the occipital bone. It consists of a pair of condyloid joints. It is a synovial joint.

=== Ligaments ===
The ligaments connecting the bones are:

- Two articular capsules
- Posterior atlanto-occipital membrane
- Anterior atlanto-occipital membrane

=== Capsule ===
The capsules of the atlantooccipital articulation surround the condyles of the occipital bone, and connect them with the articular processes of the atlas: they are thin and loose.

=== Variation ===
Atlantooccipital fusion, also known as occipitalization of the atlas, is a congenital or acquired anomaly characterized by the partial or complete fusion of the atlas to the base of the occipital bone. It is found in 0.12% to 0.72% of the population. This fusion results in the elimination or reduction of movement and abnormal neck posture, or even narrowing of the foramen magnum compressing the spinal cord.

== Function ==
The movements permitted in this joint are:

- (a) flexion and extension around the mediolateral axis, which give rise to the ordinary forward and backward nodding of the head.
- (b) slight lateral motion, lateroflexion, to one or other side around the anteroposterior axis.

Flexion is produced mainly by the action of the longi capitis and recti capitis anteriores; extension by the recti capitis posteriores major and minor, the obliquus capitis superior, the semispinalis capitis, splenius capitis, sternocleidomastoideus, and upper fibers of the trapezius.

The recti laterales are concerned in the lateral movement, assisted by the trapezius, splenius capitis, semispinalis capitis, and the sternocleidomastoideus of the same side, all acting together.

== Clinical significance ==
=== Dislocation ===
The atlanto-occipital joint may be dislocated, especially from violent accidents such as traffic collisions. This may be diagnosed using CT scans or magnetic resonance imaging of the head and neck. Surgery may be used to fix the joint and any associated bone fractures. Neck movement may be reduced long after this injury. Such injuries may also lead to hypermobility, which may be diagnosed with radiographs. This is especially true if traction is used during treatment.

== Additional images ==
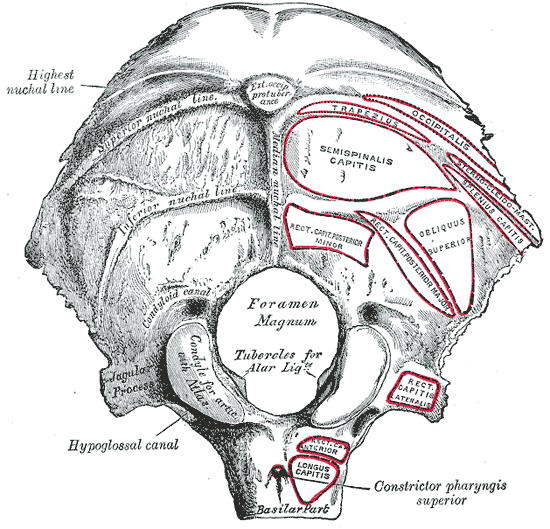
Occipital bone. Outer surface.
