= Rectus capitis posterior minor muscle =

Tendon

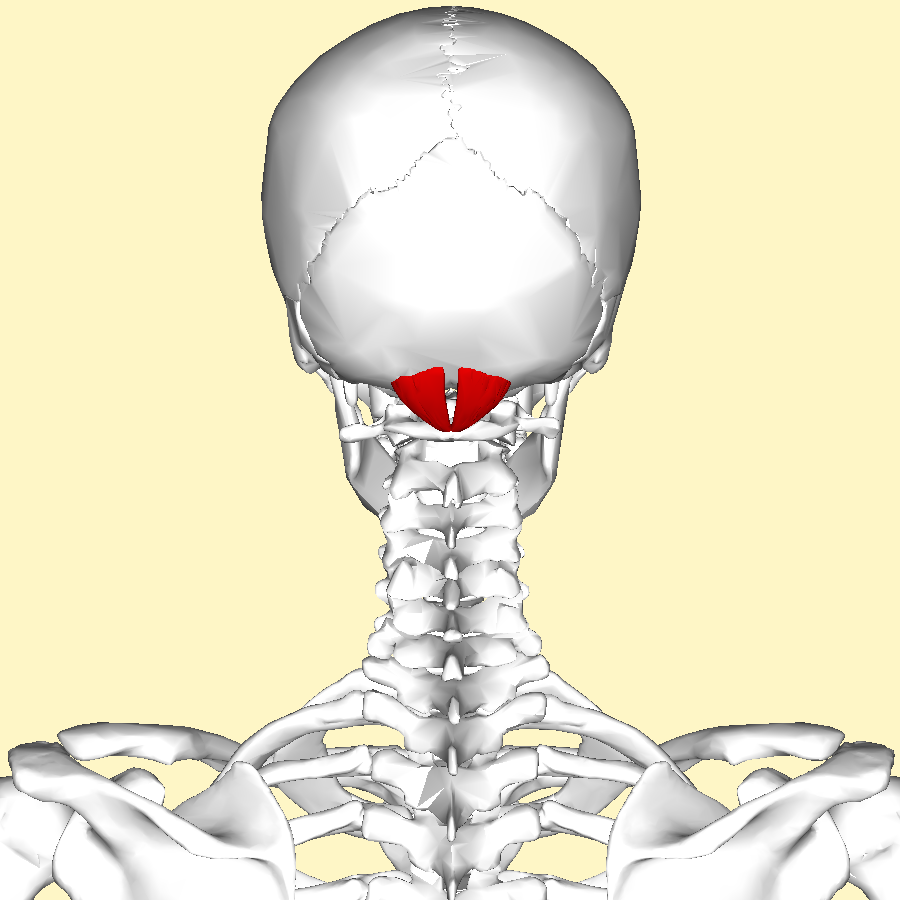
- Human skull seen from back (rectus capitis posterior minor shown in red.)

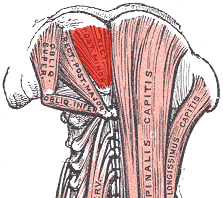
- Deep muscles of the back. (rectus capitis posterior minor labeled at top center.)

Details
- Origin: Tubercle on the posterior arch of the atlas
- Insertion: Medial part of the inferior nuchal line of the occipital bone and the surface between it and the foramen magnum
- Nerve: Branch of the dorsal primary division of the suboccipital nerve
- Actions: Extends the head at the neck, but is now considered to be more of a sensory organ than a muscle

Identifiers
- Latin: musculus rectus capitis posterior minor
- TA98: A04.2.02.005
- TA2: 2250
- FMA: 32526

The rectus capitis posterior minor (or rectus capitis posticus minor) is a muscle in the upper back part of the neck. It is one of the suboccipital muscles. Its inferior attachment is at the posterior arch of atlas; its superior attachment is onto the occipital bone at and below the inferior nuchal line. The muscle is innervated by the suboccipital nerve (the posterior ramus of first cervical spinal nerve). The muscle acts as a weak extensor of the head.

== Anatomy ==
The rectus capitis posterior minor muscle is one of the suboccipital muscles.

The muscle extends vertically superior-ward from its inferior attachment to its superior attachment. The muscle becomes broader superiorly.

=== Attachments ===
The muscle originates inferiorly by a narrow tendon from the posterior tubercle of the posterior arch of atlas.

It is inserted superiorly into the medial portion of the inferior nuchal line and the external surface of the occipital bone inferior to it (between this line superiorly and the foramen magnum inferiorly).

The muscle usually also additionally attaches onto the posterior atlantooccipital membrane (which is in turn attached onto adjacent dura mater of the spinal canal).

=== Innervation ===
The muscle receives motor innervation from the suboccipital nerve (the posterior ramus of cervical spinal nerve C1).

=== Variation ===
The muscle of either side may be doubled (along its length).

=== Actions/movements ===
The muscle is a weak extensor of the head.

The synergists are the rectus capitis posterior major and the obliquus capitis superior.

== Research ==
=== Role in headache ===
Connective tissue bridges were noted at the atlanto-occipital joint between the rectus capitis posterior minor (RCPm) muscle and the dorsal spinal dura. Similar connective tissue connections of the rectus capitis posterior major have been reported recently as well. The perpendicular arrangement of these fibers appears to restrict dural movement toward the spinal cord. The ligamentum nuchae was found to be continuous with the posterior cervical spinal dura and the lateral portion of the occipital bone. Anatomic structures innervated by cervical nerves C1-C3 have the potential to cause headache pain. Included are the joint complexes of the upper three cervical segments, the dura mater, and spinal cord.

The dura-muscular (myodural) and dura-ligamentous connections in the upper cervical spine and occipital areas may provide anatomic and physiologic answers to the cause of the cervicogenic headache. The level of strain at which RCPm muscle fibers began to tear as a result of overstretching has been estimated to be 30%. This would be expected to put them at risk of injury during whiplash-type distortions when the occipitoatlantal (OA) joint is flexed upon impact. Tearing of the muscle fibers would result in fatty infiltration (FI) that would be expected to impact the functional relationship between the RCPm muscles and the pain sensitive spinal dura. While FI and/or a reduction in the cross sectional area (CSA) of active muscle would not be expected to be the direct cause of chronic headache, it is known that muscle pathology will result in functional deficits. Pathologies in RCPm muscles in conjunction with the myodural bridge can compromise the normal functional relationship between the RCPm and the pain sensitive dura mater and result in referred head and neck pain. This could help to explain manipulation's efficacy in the treatment of cervicogenic headache.

== Additional images ==
Position of rectus capitis posterior minor muscle (shown in red). Animation.

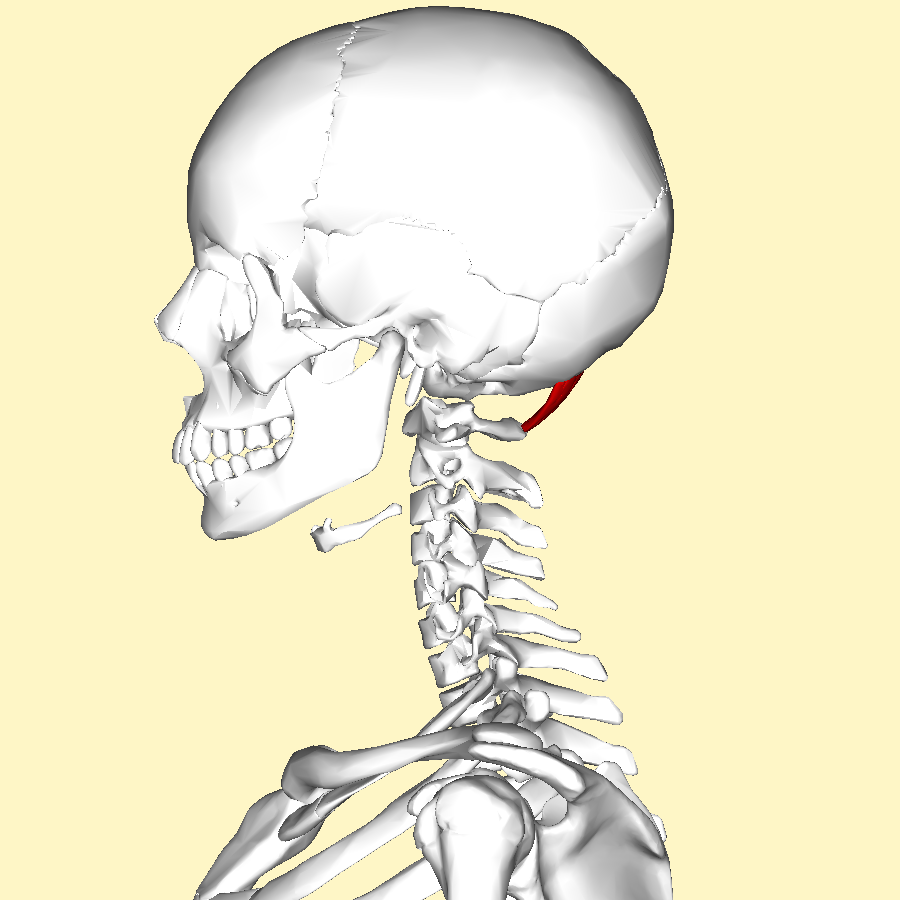
Lateral view of human skull (rectus capitis posterior minor shown in red.)

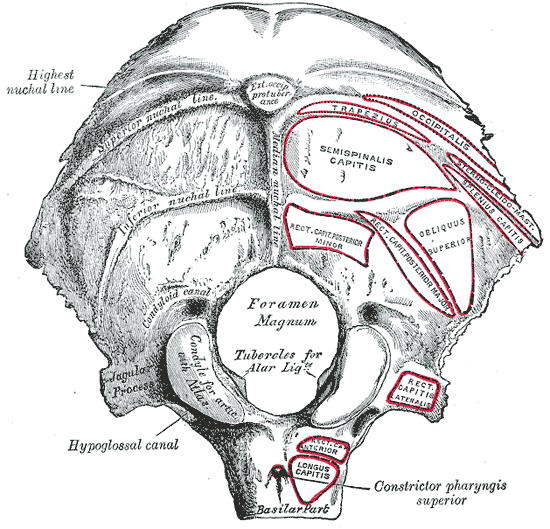
Occipital bone. Outer surface.

== See also ==
- Atlanto-occipital joint
- Rectus capitis lateralis
- Rectus capitis posterior major muscle
- Rectus capitis anterior muscle
- Suboccipital muscles
