= Vertebral venous plexuses =

Vertebral venous plexuses may refer to:

- External vertebral venous plexuses
- Internal vertebral venous plexuses
