= Suboccipital muscles =

Group of muscles of the neck

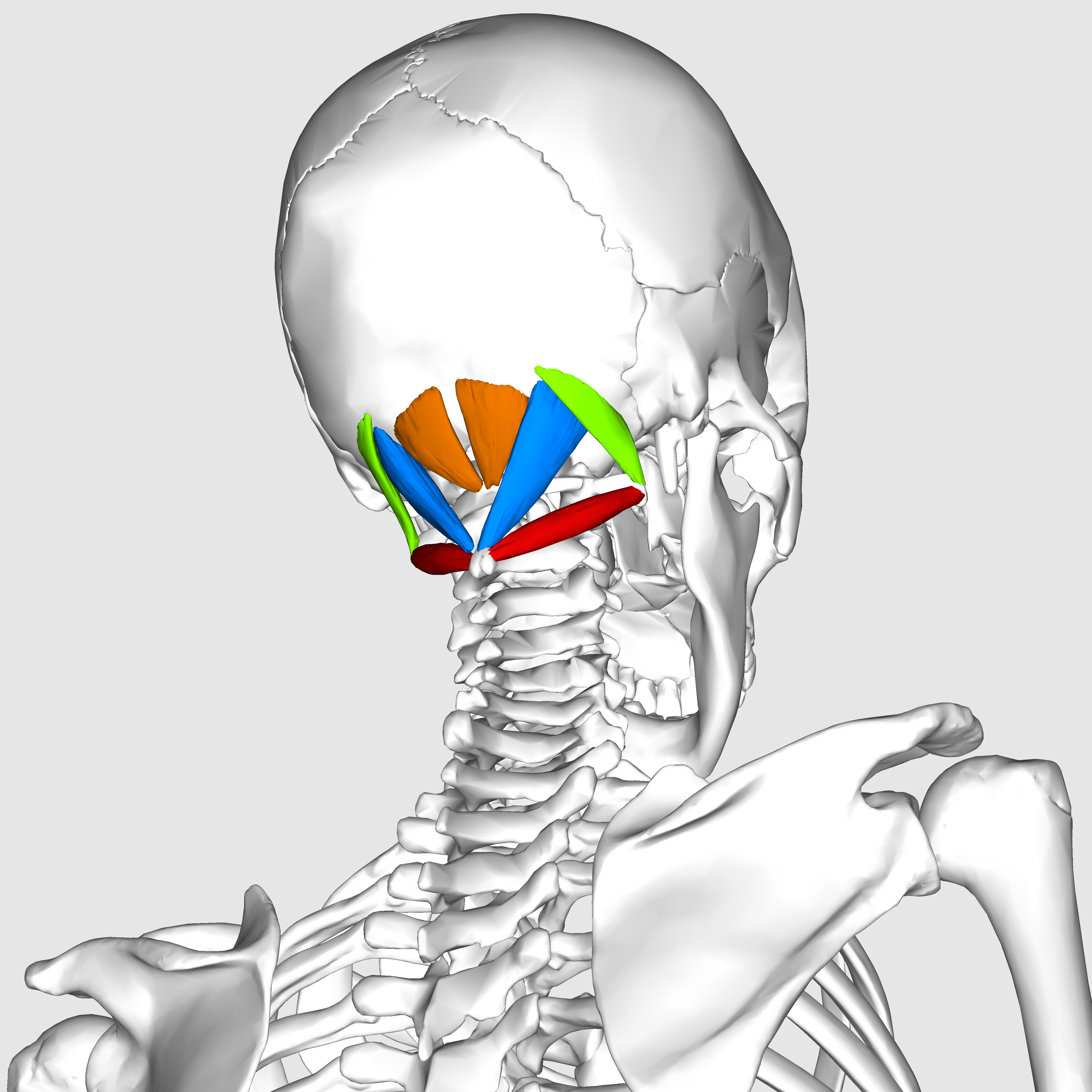
- Suboccipital muscles. Rectus capitis posterior major muscle Rectus capitis posterior minor muscle Obliquus capitis superior muscle Obliquus capitis inferior muscle

Details

Identifiers
- Latin: musculi suboccipitales
- TA98: A04.2.02.001
- TA2: 2248
- FMA: 71439

The suboccipital muscles are a group of muscles defined by their location to the occiput. Suboccipital muscles are located below the occipital bone. These are four paired muscles on the underside of the occipital bone; the two straight muscles (rectus) and the two oblique muscles (obliquus).

The muscles are named

- Rectus capitis posterior major (musculus rectus capitis dorsalis major) goes from the spinous process of the axis (C2) to the occipital bone.
- Rectus capitis posterior minor (musculus rectus capitis dorsalis minor) goes from the middle of the posterior arch of the atlas to the occiput.
- Obliquus capitis superior goes from the transverse process of the atlas to the occiput.
- Obliquus capitis inferior goes from the spine of the axis vertebra to the transverse process of the atlas.

They are innervated by the suboccipital nerve.

== Additional images ==
Position of suboccipital muscles. Animation.

Close up. Seen from below.

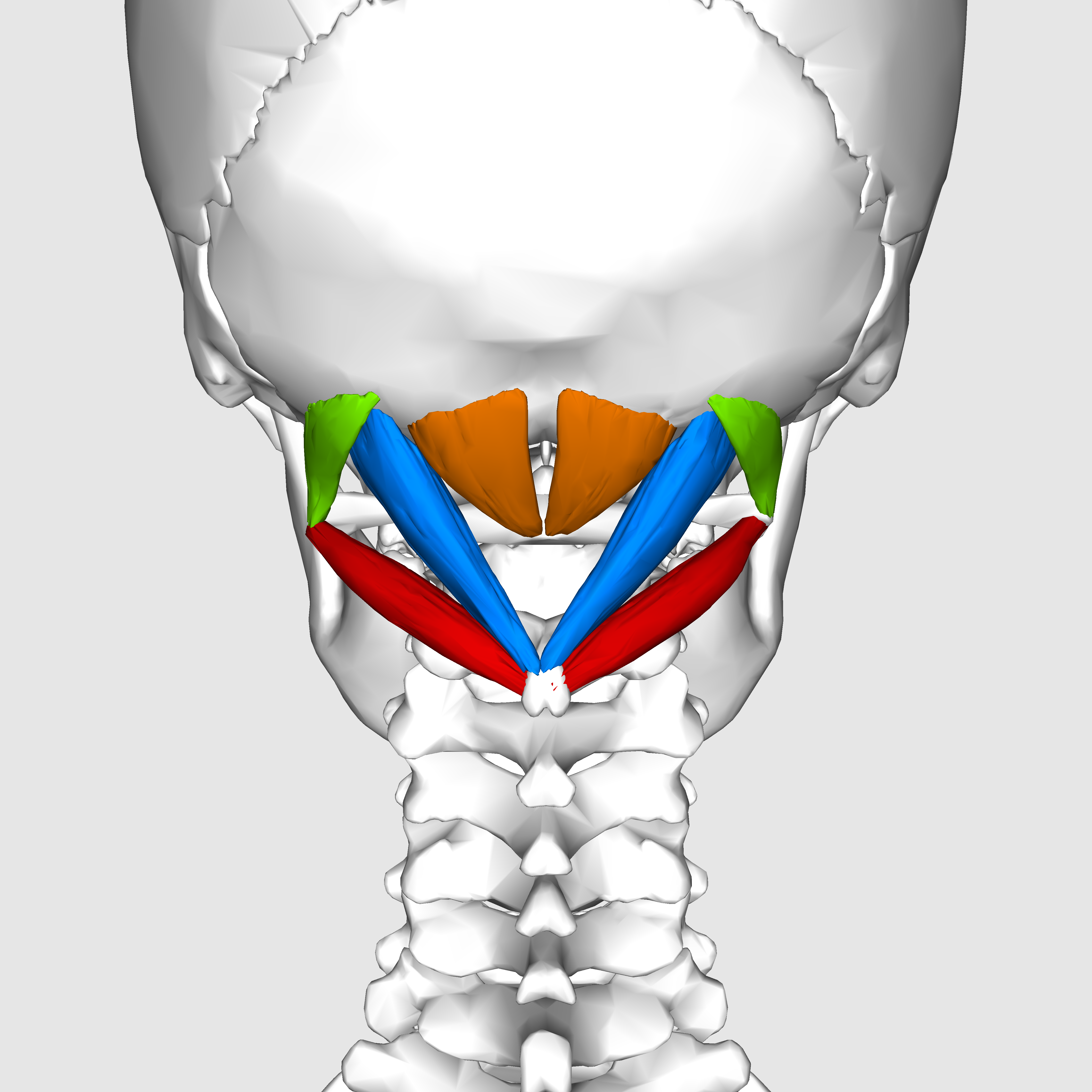
Still image.

== See also ==
- Suboccipital triangle
