= Suboccipital triangle =

Region of the neck

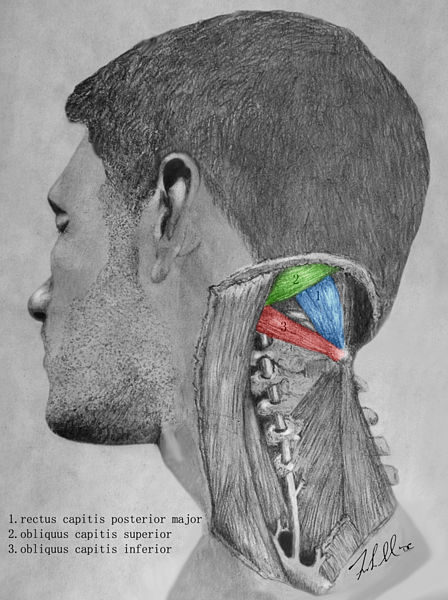
- Artist depiction of the muscles that border the suboccipital triangle.

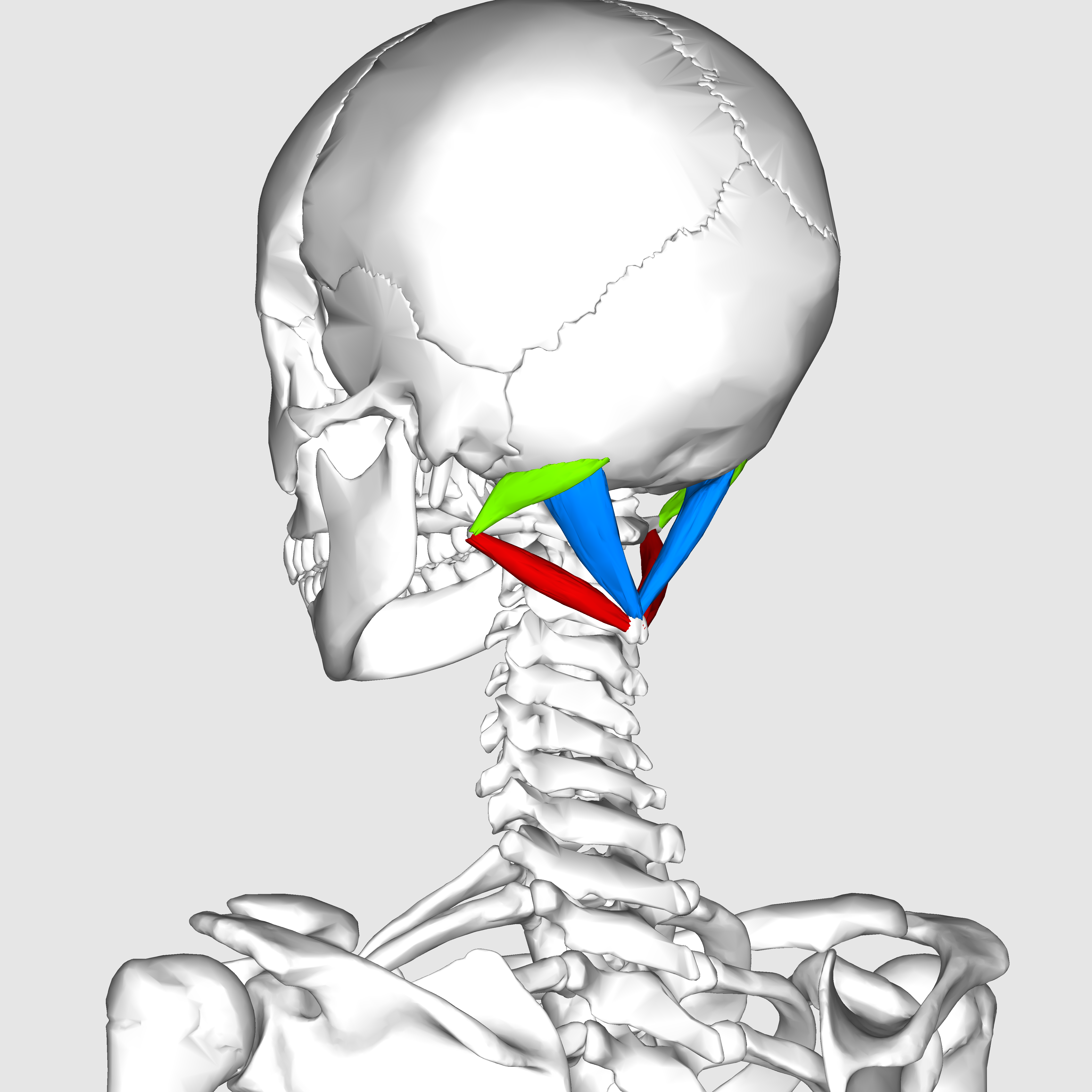
- Muscles that border the suboccipital triangle. Rectus capitis posterior major muscle Obliquus capitis superior muscle Obliquus capitis inferior muscle
- TA2: 2253

The suboccipital triangles are a paired triangular-shaped space of the upper posterior neck bounded by the following three paired muscles of the suboccipital set of muscles:

- Rectus capitis posterior major - above and medially
- Obliquus capitis superior - above and laterally
- Obliquus capitis inferior - below and laterally

(Rectus capitis posterior minor is also one of the suboccipital muscles but does not form part of the triangle)

It is covered by a layer of dense fibro-fatty tissue, situated beneath the semispinalis capitis.

The floor is formed by the posterior atlantooccipital membrane, and the posterior arch of the atlas.

In the deep groove on the upper surface of the posterior arch of the atlas are the vertebral artery and the first cervical or suboccipital nerve.

Historically, the vertebral artery was accessed here in order to perform angiography of the circle of Willis. Nowadays, angiography of the circle of Willis is performed via catheter angiography, with access being acquired at the common femoral artery. Alternatively, a computed tomographic angiogram or magnetic resonance angiogram is performed.

== Contents of the suboccipital triangle ==
1) Third part of vertebral artery
2) Dorsal ramus of nerve C1-suboccipital nerve
3) Suboccipital venous plexus

The purpose of these muscles is to provide fine motor function in movements of the head. The actions of trapezius, sternocleidomastoid and other larger muscles that move the head are refined by the relatively small suboccipital triangle muscles.

== Additional images ==
Muscles that border the suboccipital triangle. Animation.

Close up.

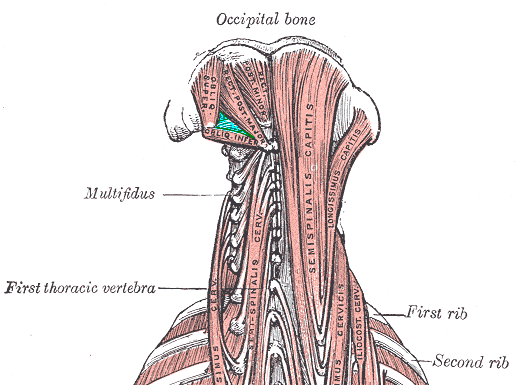
Deep muscles of the back. Triangle is highlighted in turquoise.

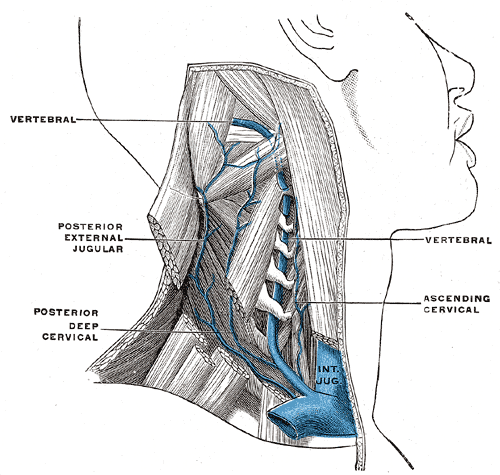
The vertebral vein.

== See also ==
- Suboccipital muscles
- Occipital artery
- Greater occipital nerve
- Lesser occipital nerve
