= Obliquus capitis superior muscle =

Muscle of the neck

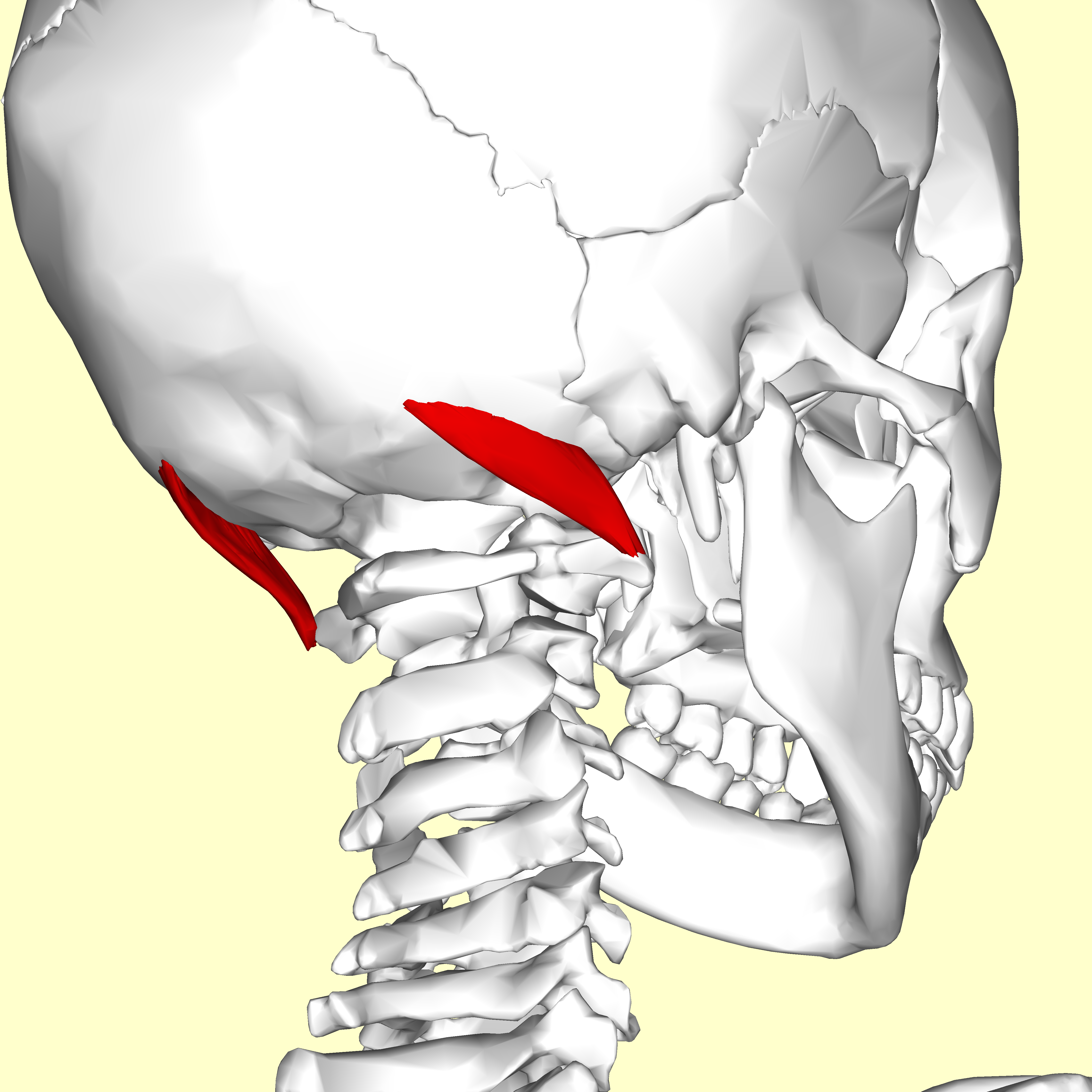
- Skull seen from behind (obliquus capitis superior shown in red)

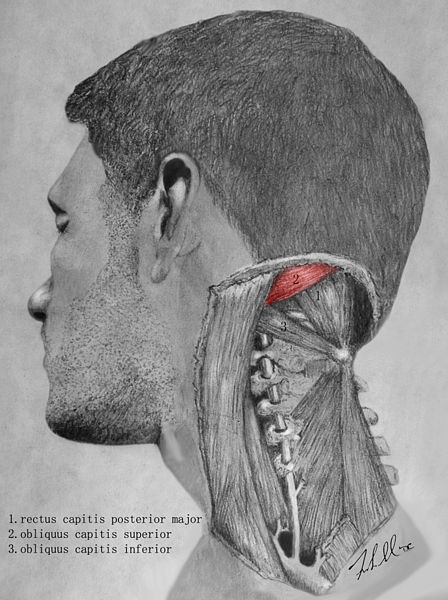
- Obliquus capitis superior (red) and its relationship to other suboccipital muscles.

Details
- Origin: Lateral mass of atlas
- Insertion: Lateral half of the inferior nuchal line
- Nerve: Suboccipital nerve
- Actions: Extends head and flex head to the ipsilateral side

Identifiers
- Latin: musculus obliquus capitis superior
- TA98: A04.2.02.006
- TA2: 2251
- FMA: 32527

The obliquus capitis superior muscle (/əˈblaɪkwəs ˈkæpɪtɪs/) is a small muscle in the upper back part of the neck. It is one of the suboccipital muscles. It attaches inferiorly at the transverse process of the atlas (first cervical vertebra); it attaches superiorly at the external surface of the occipital bone. The muscle is innervated by the suboccipital nerve (the posterior ramus of the first cervical spinal nerve).

It acts at the atlanto-occipital joint to extend the head and bend the head to the same side.

== Anatomy ==
The obliquus capitis superior muscle is one of the suboccipital muscles. It forms the superolateral boundary of the suboccipital triangle. It extends superoposteriorly from its inferior attachment to its superior attachment, becoming wider superiorly.

=== Attachments ===
The muscle originates inferiorly by tendinous fibers from the superior surface of the transverse process of the atlas (C1).

It is inserted superiorly into the lateral portion of the external surface of the occipital bone between the superior nuchal line and inferior nuchal line. Its superior attachment is situated lateral to that of the semispinalis capitis muscle, and overlaps the attachment of the rectus capitis posterior major muscle.

=== Innervation ===
The muscle receives motor innervation from the suboccipital nerve (i.e. the posterior ramus of the cervical spinal nerve 1 (C1)).

=== Actions/movements ===
The muscle extends and (ipsilaterally) laterally flexes the head.

== Additional images ==
Position of obliquus capitis superior (shown in red). Animation.

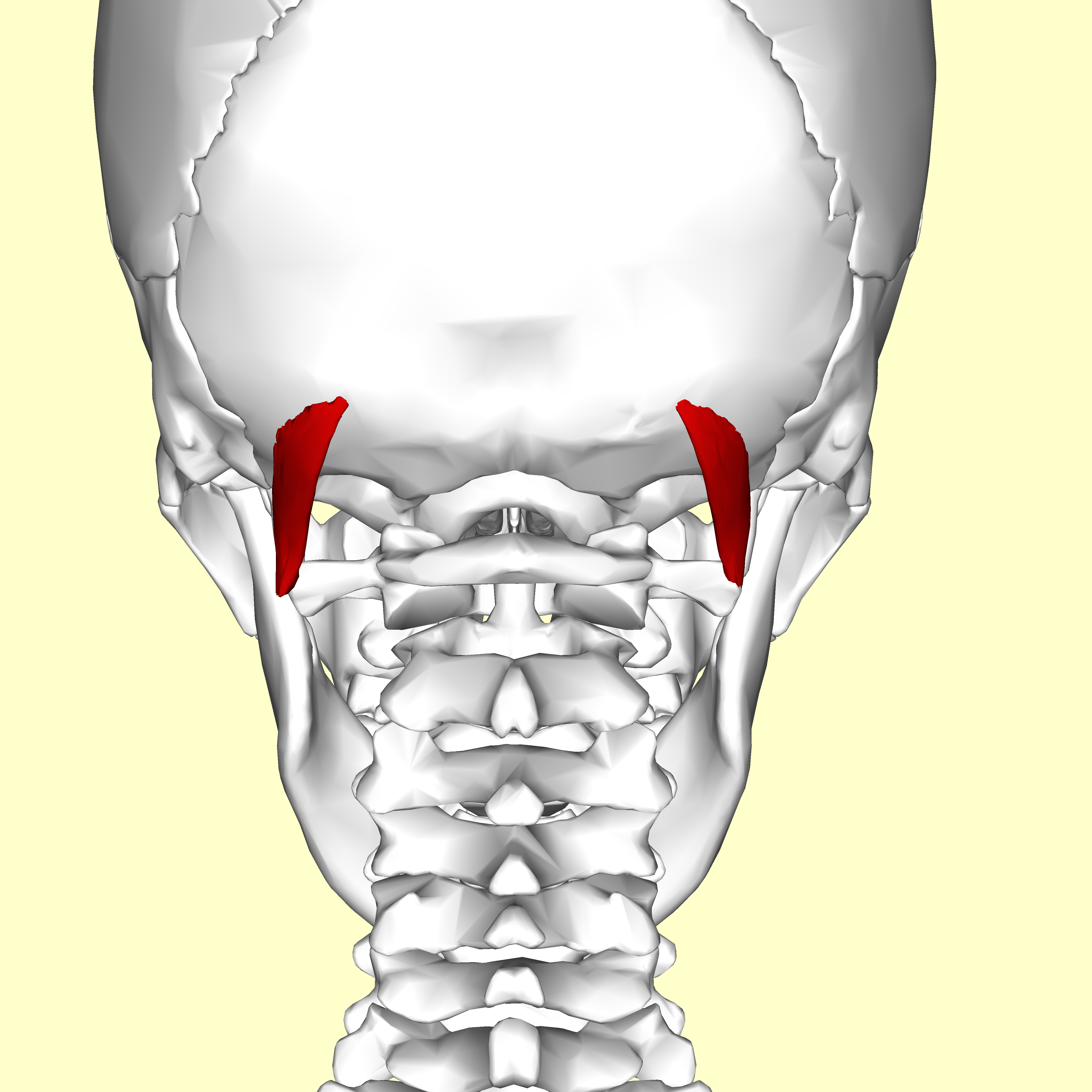
Still image. Posterior view.

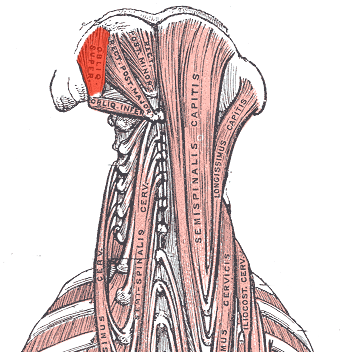
Deep muscles of the back (obliquus capitis superior labeled at upper left)

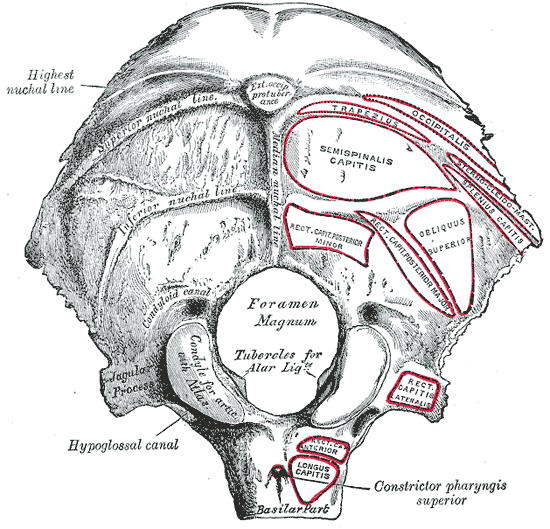
Occipital bone. Outer surface. Muscle attachments are shown as red circles.

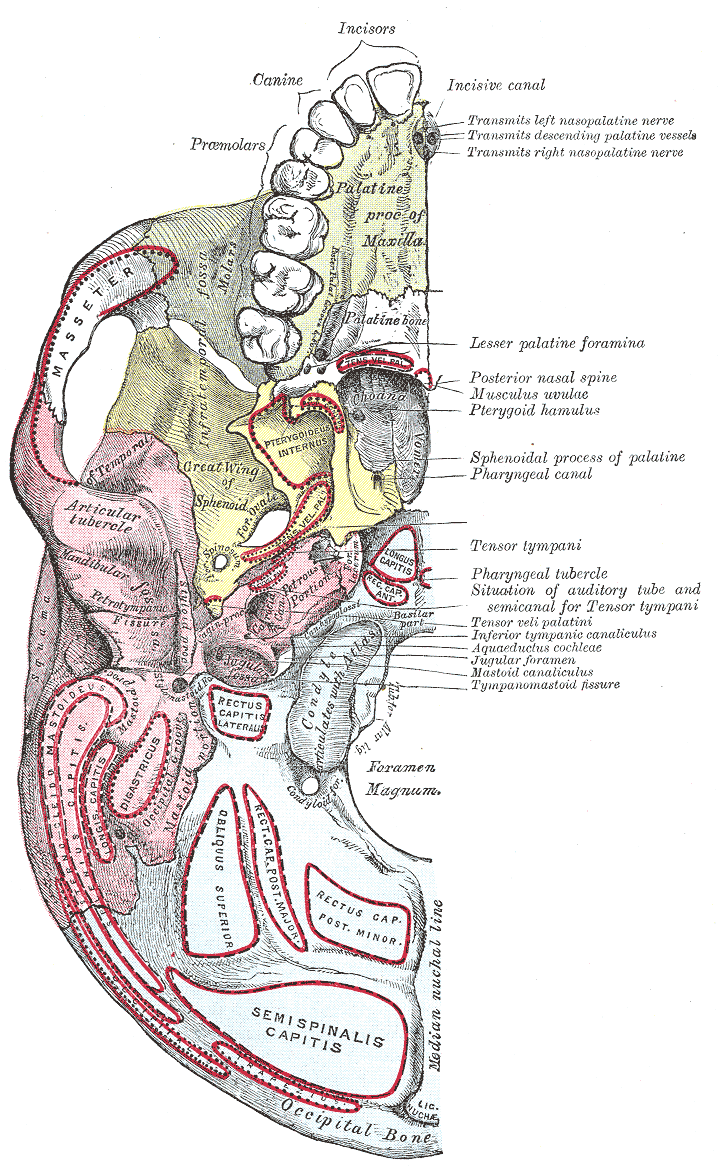
Base of skull. Inferior surface. Muscle attachments are shown as red circles.

== See also ==
Suboccipital muscles
