= Vertebral artery =

Major arteries of the neck

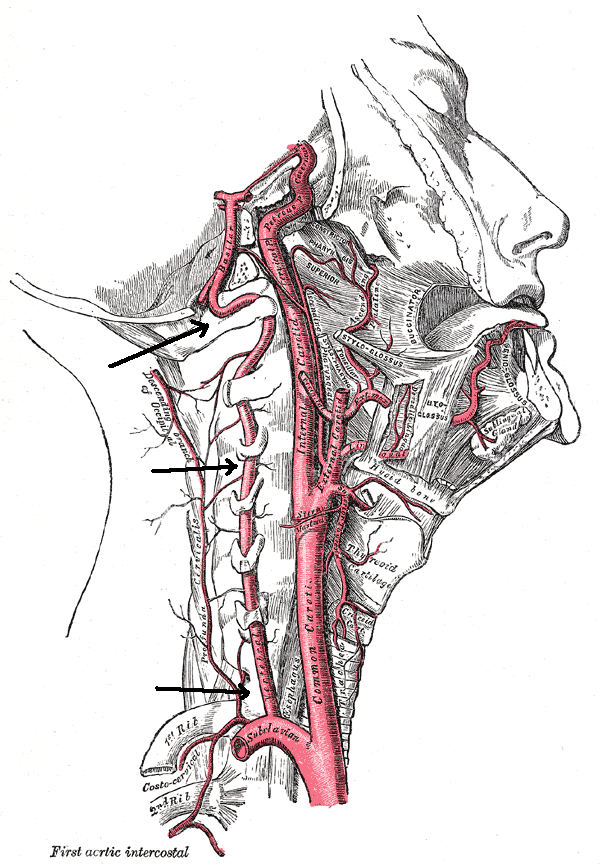
- Arteries of the neck. The vertebral arteries arise from the subclavian arteries and join to form the basilar artery

Details
- Source: Subclavian artery
- Branches: Basilar artery Posterior spinal artery Anterior spinal artery Posterior inferior cerebellar artery
- Vein: Vertebral vein

Identifiers
- Latin: arteria vertebralis
- MeSH: D014711
- TA98: A12.2.08.002
- TA2: 4538
- FMA: 3956

The vertebral arteries are major arteries of the neck. Typically, the vertebral arteries originate from the subclavian arteries. Each vessel courses superiorly along each side of the neck, merging within the skull to form the single, midline basilar artery. As the supplying component of the vertebrobasilar vascular system, the vertebral arteries supply blood to the upper spinal cord, brainstem, cerebellum, and posterior part of brain.

== Structure ==
The vertebral artery typically arises from the superior aspect of the central subclavian artery on each side of the body, then enters deep to the transverse process at the level of the 6th cervical vertebrae (C6),. It then proceeds superiorly, in the transverse foramen of each cervical vertebra. Once it has passed through the transverse foramen of C1 (also known as the atlas), the vertebral artery travels across the posterior arch of C1 and through the suboccipital triangle before entering the foramen magnum.

Nunziante Ippolito, a Neapolitan physician, identified the "angle of Nunziante Ippolito" to find the vertebral artery, between the anterior scalene muscle and the longus colli muscle.

Inside the skull, both vertebral arteries join to form the basilar artery at the base of the pons. The basilar artery is the main blood supply to the brainstem and connects to the Circle of Willis to potentially supply the rest of the brain if there is compromise to one of the carotids. At each cervical level, the vertebral artery sends branches to the surrounding musculature via the anterior spinal arteries.

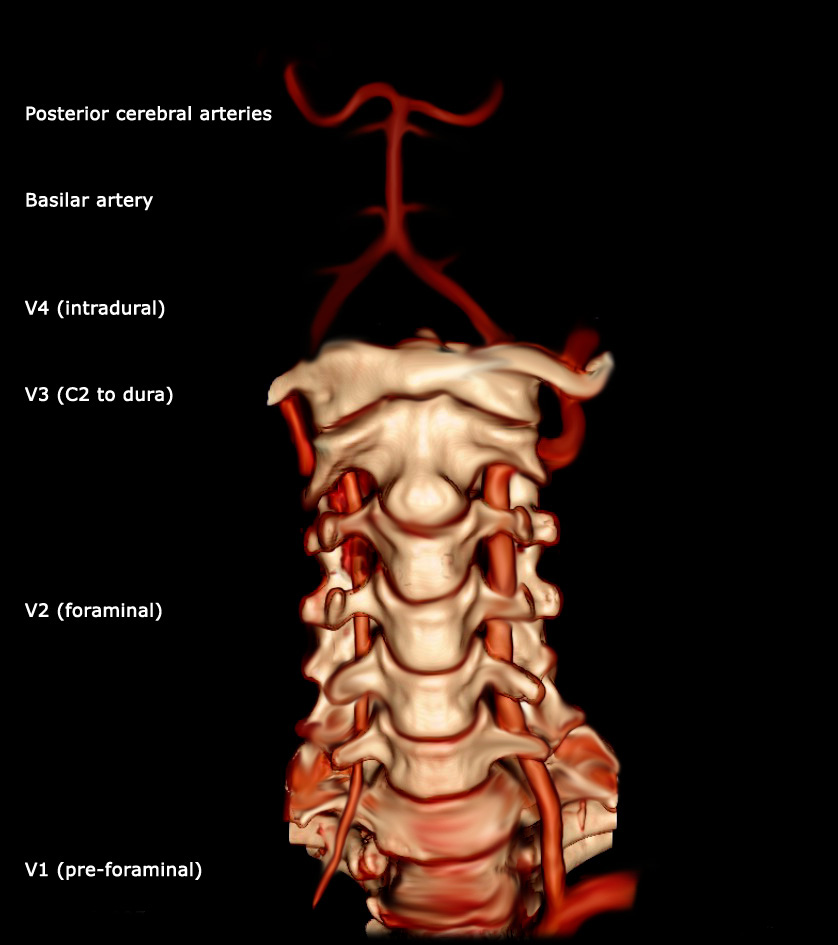
Segments of vertebral artery anterior projection

The vertebral artery may be divided into four parts:

- The first (preforaminal) part runs upward and backward between the anterior scalene and the longus colli muscles (angle of Nunziante Ippolito). In front of it are the internal jugular and vertebral veins, and is crossed by the inferior thyroid artery; the left vertebral is also crossed by the thoracic duct. Behind it are the transverse process of the seventh cervical vertebra, the sympathetic trunk and its inferior cervical ganglion
- The second (foraminal) part runs upward through the transverse foramina of the C6 to C2 vertebrae, and is surrounded by branches from the inferior cervical sympathetic ganglion and by a plexus of veins which unite to form the vertebral vein at the lower part of the neck. It is situated in front of the trunks of the cervical nerves, and pursues an almost vertical course as far as the transverse process of the axis.
- The third (extradural or atlantic) part issues from the C2 foramen transversarium on the medial side of the Rectus capitis lateralis. It is further subdivided into the vertical part V3v passing vertically upwards, crossing the C2 root and entering the foramen transversarium of C1, and the horizontal part V3h, curving medially and posteriorly behind the superior articular process of the atlas, the anterior ramus of the first cervical nerve being on its medial side; it then lies in the groove on the upper surface of the posterior arch of the atlas, and enters the vertebral canal by passing beneath the posterior atlantoöccipital membrane. This part of the artery is covered by the Semispinalis capitis and is contained in the suboccipital triangle—a triangular space bounded by the Rectus capitis posterior major, the Obliquus superior, and the Obliquus inferior. The first cervical or suboccipital nerve lies between the artery and the posterior arch of the atlas.
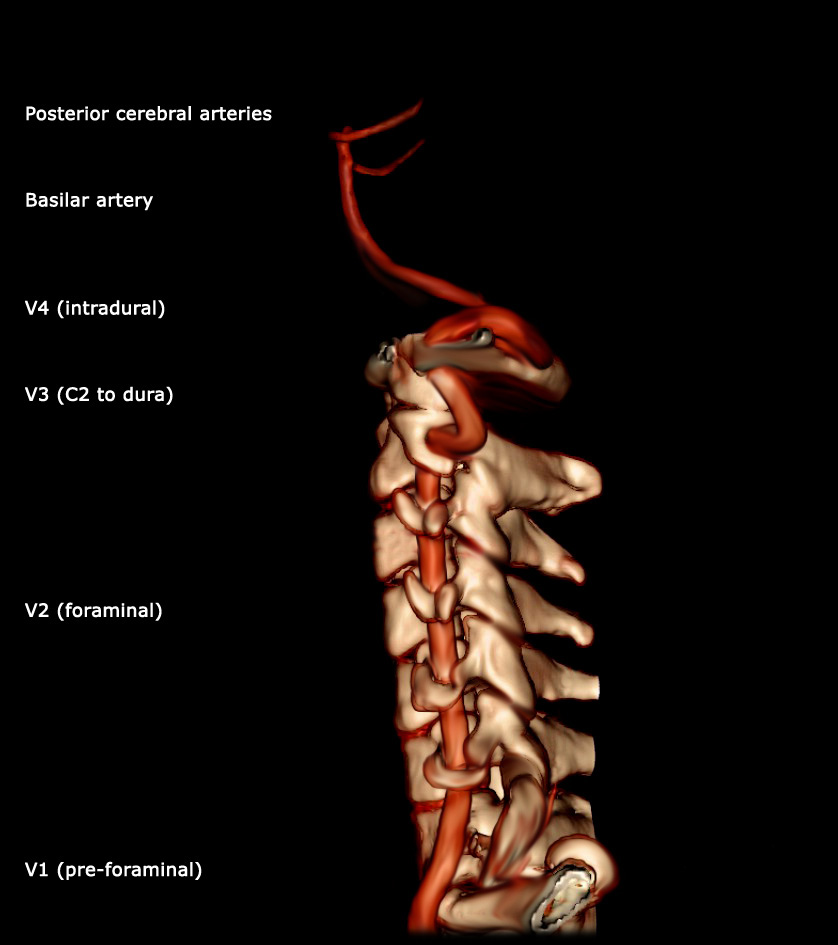
- Segments of vertebral artery lateral projection
  The fourth (intradural or intracranial) part pierces the dura mater and inclines medially to the front of the medulla oblongata; it is placed between the hypoglossal nerve and the anterior root of the first cervical nerve and beneath the first digitation of the ligamentum denticulatum. In the midline at the medullopontine sulcus, it merges with the vessel of the opposite side to form the basilar artery.

=== Triangle ===
Triangle of the vertebral artery is a region within the root of the neck and has following boundaries:

- Medial border of anterior scalene muscle (lateral)
- Lateral border of longus colli muscle (medial)
- Carotid tubercle (apex)
- First part of subclavian artery (base)

The vertebral artery runs from base to apex (prior to entering the transverse foramen of 6th cervical vertebra).

The carotid tubercle separates the vertebral artery which passes directly behind it from the common carotid artery which lies directly in front of it. The ideal site for palpating the carotid pulse is to gently press the common carotid artery against the carotid tubercle.

=== Variation ===
There is commonly variations in the course and size of the vertebral arteries, usually on both sides artery diameters are asymmetrical. For example, differences in size between left and right vertebral arteries may range from a slight asymmetry to marked hypoplasia of one side, with studies estimating a prevalence of unilateral vertebral artery hypoplasia between 2% and 25%. In 3-15% of the population, a bony bridge called the arcuate foramen covers the groove for the vertebral artery on vertebra C1. Rarely, the vertebral arteries enter the subarachnoid space at C1-C2 (3%) or C2-C3 (only three cases have been reported) vertebral levels instead of the atlanto-occipital level.

The portion of vertebral arteries located within the skull (intracranial) have diameters of 3.17 mm. The intracranial length for the left vertebral artery (32.4 mm) is longer than the right (31.5 mm). The angle where vertebral arteries meet the basilar artery (vertebrobasilar junction), is 46 degrees.

==== Vertebral artery dominance ====
Vertebral artery dominance (VAD) is typically a normal congenital vascular variation of the vertebral arteries. It refers to the asymmetry of the VA diameters on both sides, with the larger diameter being the dominant side and the smaller diameter being the nondominant side.

In one study, the left vertebral artery diameter dominance was present in 54% of cases, while the right diameter was dominant in 30%. In 16% of cases, the left and right arterial diameters were equal.

== Function ==
As the supplying component of the vertebrobasilar vascular system, the vertebral arteries supply blood to the upper spinal cord, brainstem, cerebellum, and posterior part of brain.

== Clinical significance ==
As the supplying component of the vertebrobasilar vascular system, the vertebral arteries supply blood to the upper spinal cord, brainstem, cerebellum, and posterior part of brain. A stroke of the arteries may result in a posterior circulation stroke.

Chiropractic manipulation of the neck has the potential to cause a vertebral arterial dissection.

== Diagnostics ==
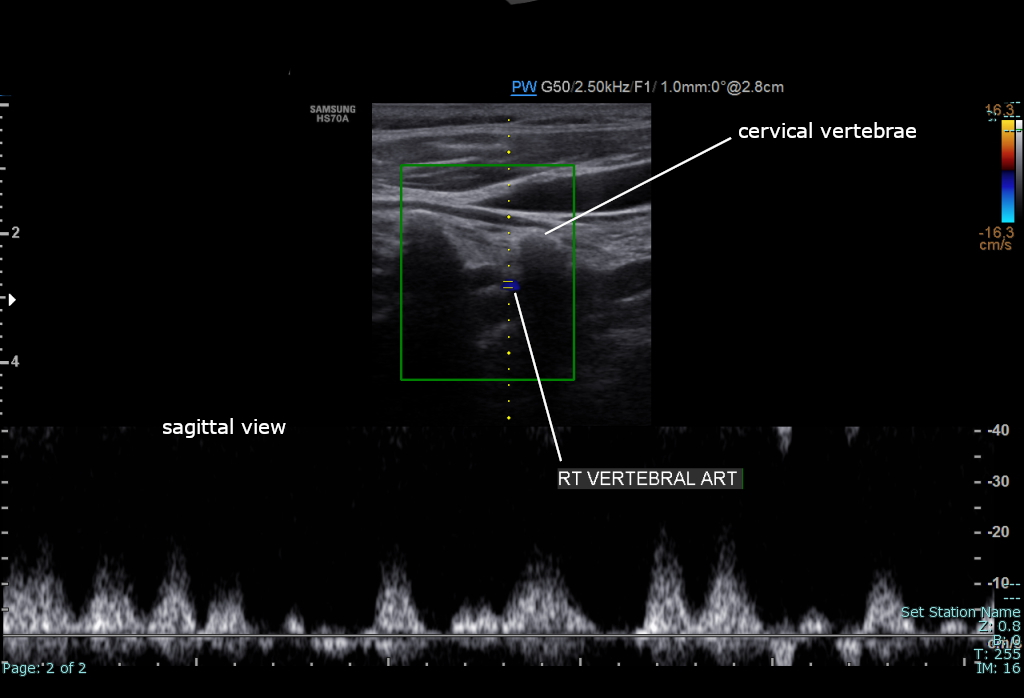
Sagittal section of the right vertebral artery on Doppler ultrasound

The condition and health of the vertebral carotid arteries is usually evaluated using Doppler ultrasound, CT angiography or phase contrast magnetic resonance imaging (PC-MRI).

Typically, blood flow velocities in the carotid artery are measured in terms of peak systolic velocity (PSV) and end diastolic velocity (EDV).

Normally, vertebral artery blood flow velocity can be 63.6 ± 17.5 cm/s during PSV and 16.1 ± 5.1 cm/s during EDV according to a study done by Kuhl et al. Due to vertebral artery dominance, measurements can vary on both sides, for example, another study by Seidel et al. found that the right side had an average of 45.9 cm/s and the left side 51.5 cm/s during PSV, and 13.8 cm/s on the right side and 16.1 cm/s on the left side during EDV.

== Additional images ==
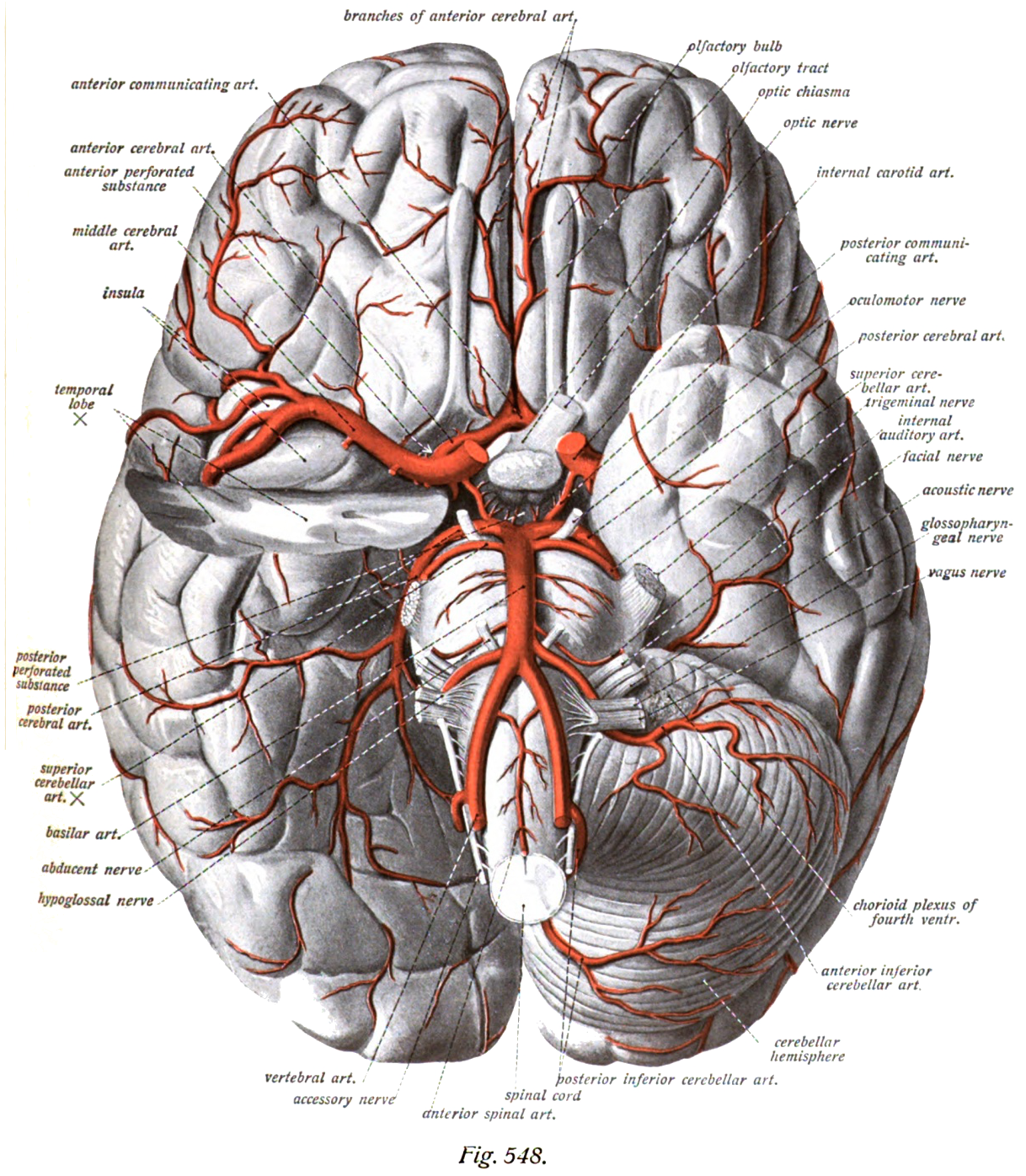
The arteries of the base of the brain (inferior view).

Diagram of the arterial circulation at the base of the brain.

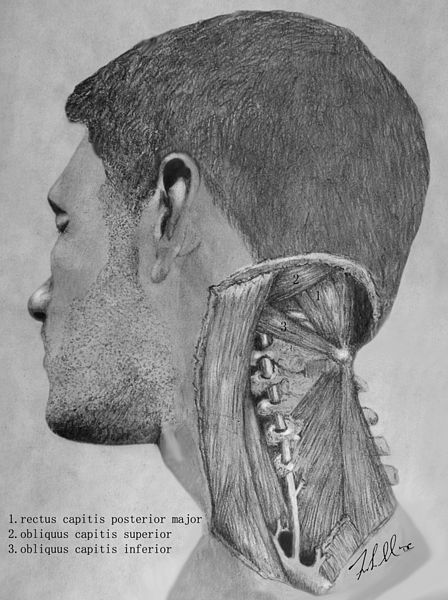
Relationship of the vertebral artery to the suboccipital muscles.
