= Suboccipital nerve =

Nerve of the head

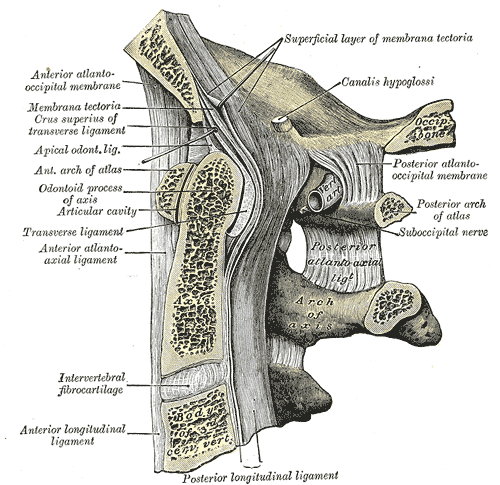
- Median sagittal section through the occipital bone and first three cervical vertebrae. (Suboccipital nerve labeled at center right.)

Details
- Innervates: Rectus capitis posterior major, rectus capitis posterior minor, obliquus capitis superior, obliquus capitis inferior

Identifiers
- Latin: nervus suboccipitalis
- TA98: A14.2.02.007
- TA2: 6365
- FMA: 7054

The suboccipital nerve (first cervical dorsal ramus) is the dorsal primary ramus of the first cervical nerve (C1). It exits the spinal cord between the skull and the first cervical vertebra, the atlas.

It lies within the suboccipital triangle along with the vertebral artery, where the artery enters the foramen magnum.

It supplies muscles of the suboccipital triangle, the rectus capitis posterior major, obliquus capitis superior, and obliquus capitis inferior. The suboccipital nerve also innervates rectus capitis posterior minor.

== See also ==
- Vertebral artery

== Additional images ==
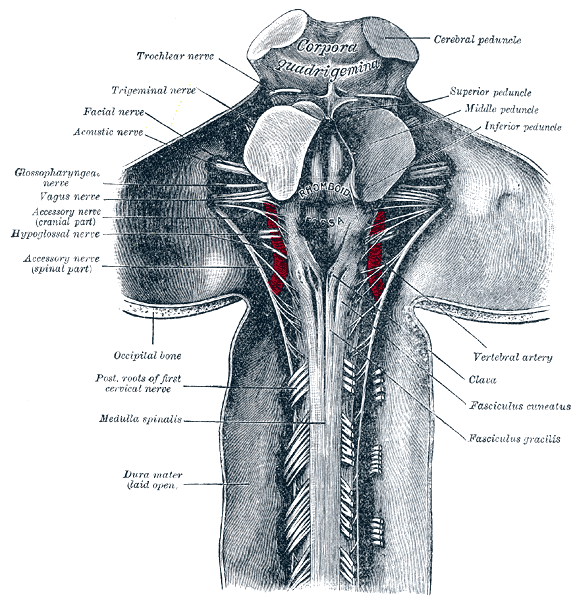
Upper part of medulla spinalis and hind- and mid-brains; posterior aspect, exposed in situ.

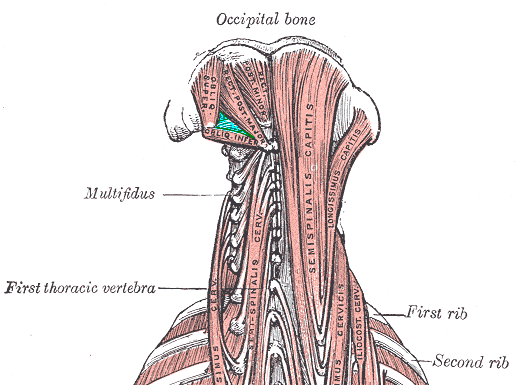
Suboccipital triangle
