= Cervical spinal nerve 1 =

Spinal nerve of the cervical segment

Cervical spinal nerve
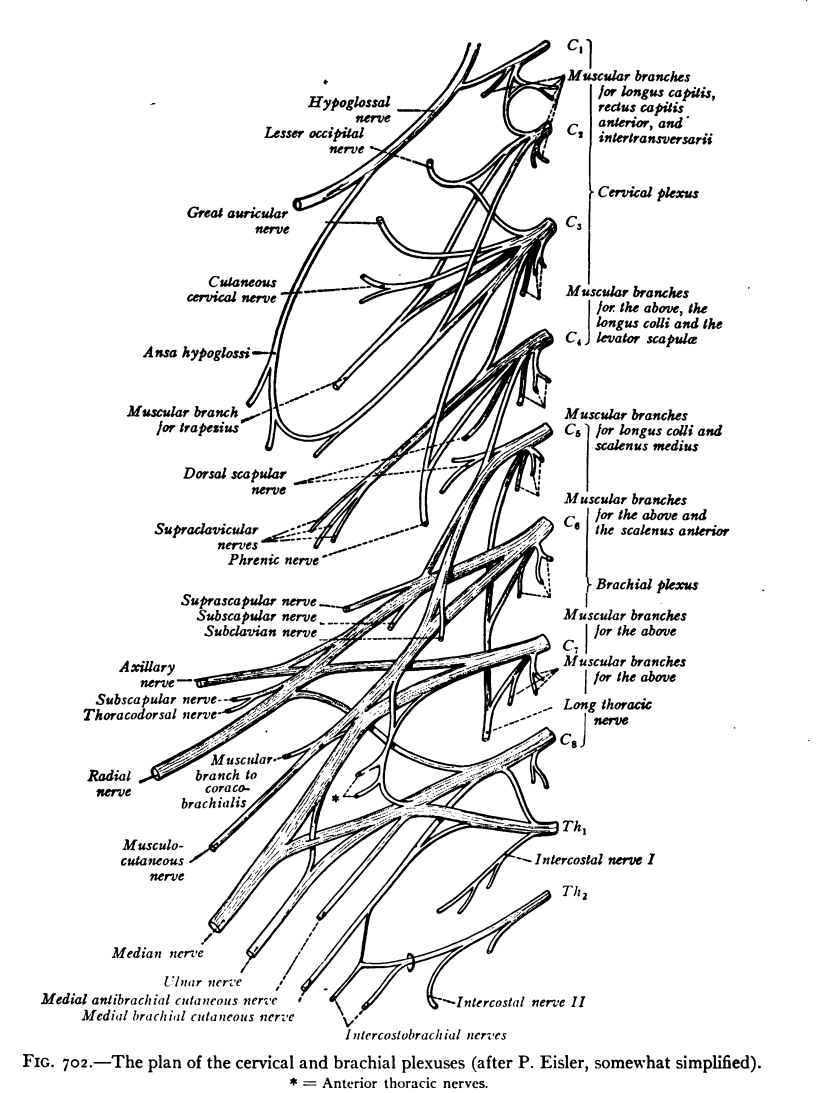
- The plan of the cervical and brachial plexuses

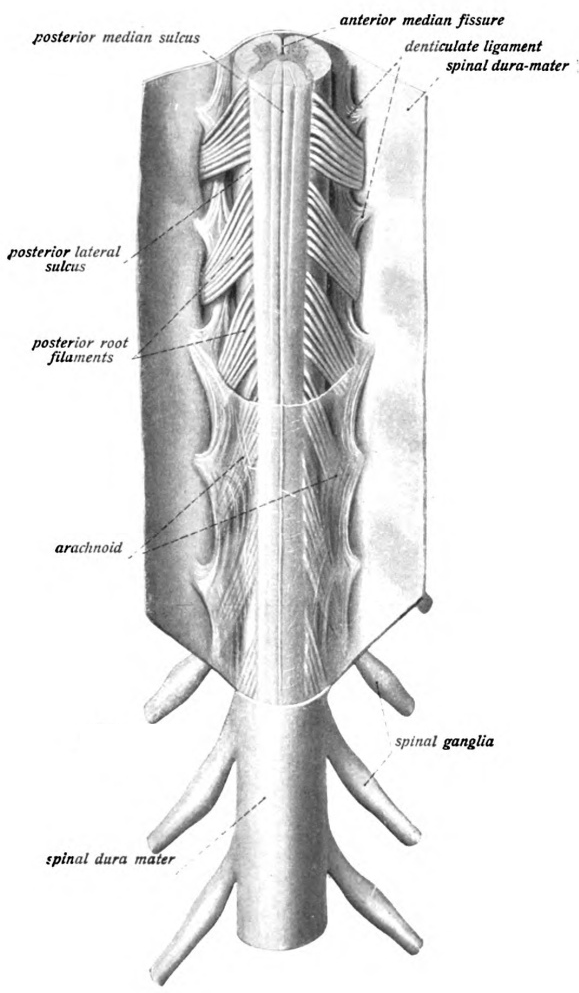
- The spinal cord with spinal nerves

Details

Identifiers
- Latin: nervi spinalis
- FMA: 6440

The cervical spinal nerve 1 (C1) is a spinal nerve of the cervical segment. C1 carries predominantly motor fibres, but also a small meningeal branch that supplies sensation to parts of the dura around the foramen magnum (via dorsal rami).

It originates from the spinal column from above the cervical vertebra 1 (C1).

The dorsal root and ganglion of the first cervical nerve may be rudimentary or entirely absent.

Muscles innervated by this nerve are:

- Geniohyoid muscle- through hypoglossal nerve
- Thyrohyoid muscle – through hypoglossal nerve
- Rectus capitis anterior muscle
- Longus capitis muscle (partly)
- Rectus capitis lateralis muscle
- Splenius cervicis muscle (partly)
- Rectus capitis posterior major muscle
- levator scapulae muscle (partly)
- Omohyoid – through ansa cervicalis
- Sternohyoid – through ansa cervicalis
- Sternothyroid - through ansa cervicalis
