= Rectus capitis posterior major muscle =

Muscle

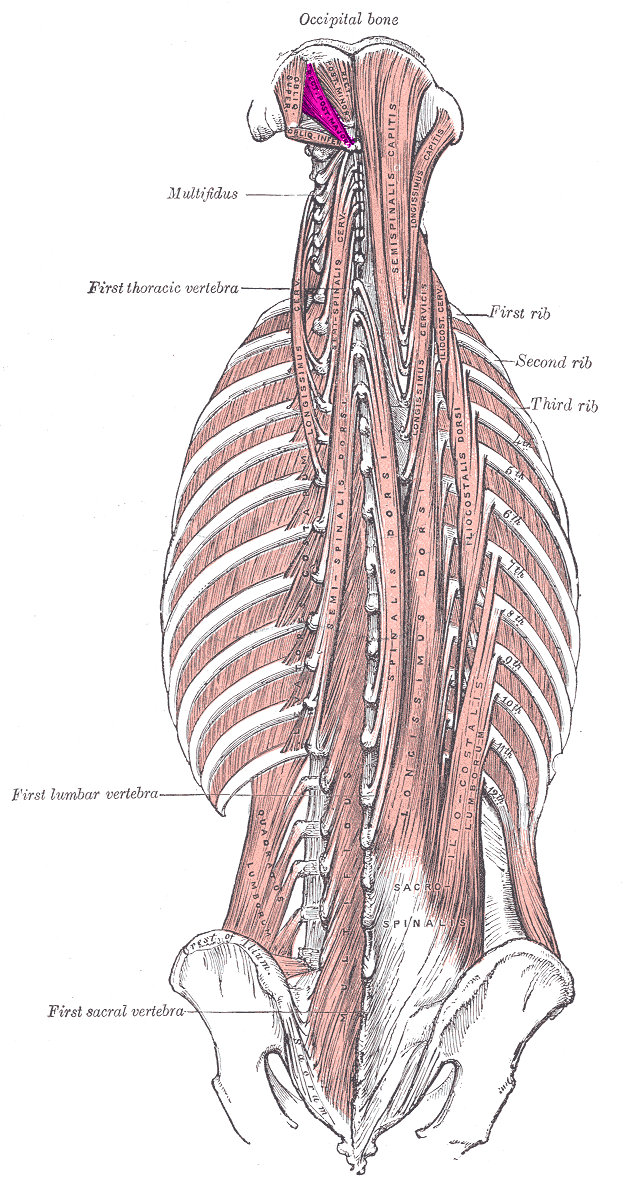
- Deep muscles of the back. (Rect. post. major visible at upper left.)

Details
- Origin: Spinous process of the axis (C2)
- Insertion: Inferior nuchal line of the occipital bone
- Artery: Occipital artery
- Nerve: Dorsal ramus of C1 (suboccipital nerve), sub-occipital nerve
- Actions: Ipsilateral rotation of head and extension

Identifiers
- Latin: musculus rectus capitis posterior major
- TA98: A04.2.02.004
- TA2: 2249
- FMA: 32525

The rectus capitis posterior major (or rectus capitis posticus major) is a muscle in the upper back part of the neck. It is one of the suboccipital muscles. Its inferior attachment is at the spinous process of the axis (Second cervical vertebra); its superior attachment is onto the outer surface of the occipital bone on and around the side part of the inferior nuchal line. The muscle is innervated by the suboccipital nerve (the posterior ramus of cervical spinal nerve C1). The muscle acts to extend the head and rotate the head to its side.

== Anatomy ==
The rectus capitis posterior major muscle is one of the suboccipital muscles. It forms the superomedial boundary of the suboccipital triangle.

The muscle extends obliquely superiolaterally from its inferior attachment to its superior attachment. It becomes broader superiorly.

=== Attachments ===
The muscle originates inferiorly by a pointed tendon from (the external aspect of) the (bifid) spinous process of the axis (cervical vertebra C2).

It is inserted superiorly into (the lateral portion of) the inferior nuchal line and the surface of the occipital bone just inferior to this line.

=== Innervation ===
The muscle receives motor innervation from the suboccipital nerve (the posterior ramus of cervical spinal nerve C1).

=== Relations ===
Superiorly, as the two muscles diverge laterally, they create between them a triangular space in which parts of the two recti capitis posteriores minores muscles are exposed.

=== Actions/movements ===
The muscle extends the head and (acting together with the obliquus capitis inferior muscle) ipsilaterally rotates the head.

== Function ==
Its main actions are to extend and rotate the atlanto-occipital joint.

== Research ==
A soft tissue connection bridging from the rectus capitis posterior major to the cervical dura mater was described in 2011. Various clinical manifestations may be linked to this anatomical relationship. It has also been postulated that this connection serves as a monitor of dural tension along with the rectus capitis posterior minor and the obliquus capitis inferior.

== See also ==
- Atlanto-occipital joint
- Rectus capitis lateralis
- Rectus capitis posterior minor muscle
- Rectus capitis anterior muscle
- Suboccipital muscles

== Additional images ==
Position of rectus capitis posterior major muscle (shown in red).

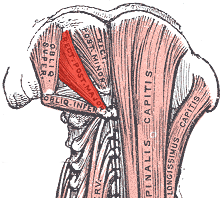
Rectus capitis posterior major muscle.

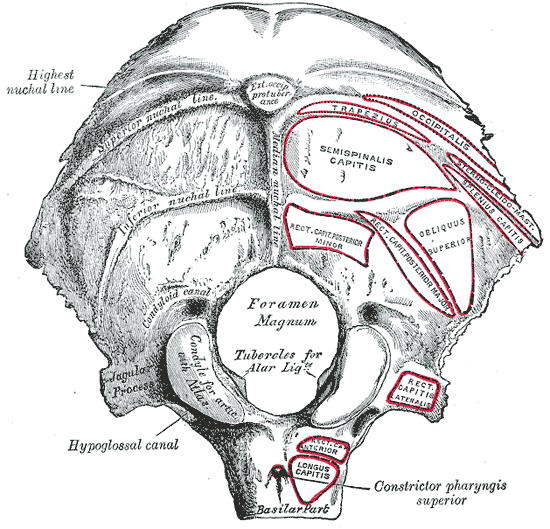
Occipital bone. Outer surface.

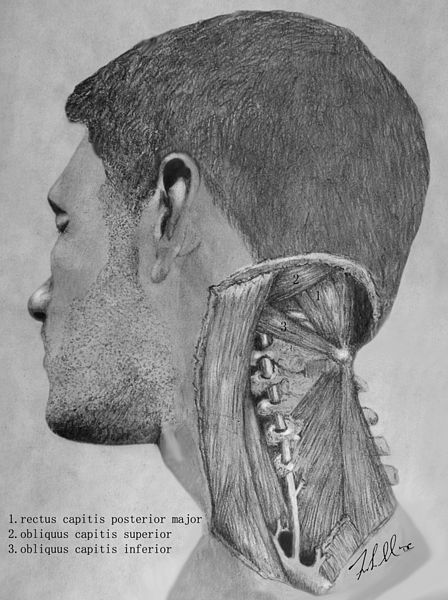
Rectus capitis posterior major's relationship to other suboccipital muscles.
