= Dorsal ramus of spinal nerve =

Posterior division of a spinal nerve

- Diagram of spinal nerve

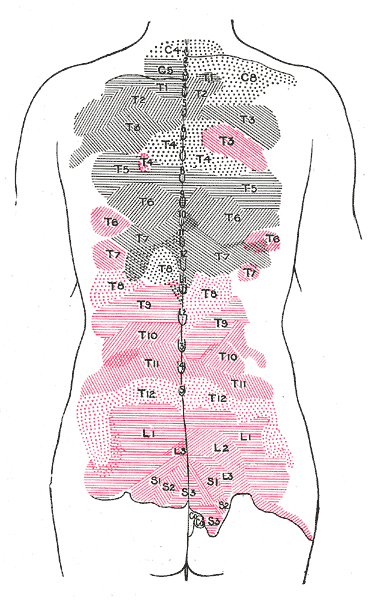
- Areas of distribution of the cutaneous branches of the posterior divisions of the spinal nerves. The areas of the medial branches are in black, those of the lateral in red.

Details

Identifiers
- Latin: ramus posterior nervi spinalis
- TA98: A14.2.00.035
- TA2: 6151
- FMA: 5983

The dorsal ramus of spinal nerve, posterior ramus of spinal nerve, or posterior primary division is the posterior division of a spinal nerve. The dorsal rami provide motor innervation to the deep (a.k.a. intrinsic or true) muscles of the back, and sensory innervation to the skin of the posterior portion of the head, neck and back.

A spinal nerve splits within the intervertebral foramen to form a dorsal ramus and a ventral ramus. The dorsal ramus then turns to course posterior-ward before splitting into a medial branch and a lateral branch. Both these branches provide motor innervation to deep back muscles. In the neck and upper back, the medial branch is also responsible for providing sensory innervation of the skin; in the lower back, the lateral branch does so. All medial branches additionally also provide sensory innervation to the zygapophyseal joints and periosteum of the vertebral column.

== Structure ==
Ventral root axons join with dorsal root ganglia to form mixed spinal nerves (below). These then merge to form peripheral nerves. Shortly after this spinal nerve forms, it then branches into the dorsal ramus and ventral ramus. Spinal nerves are mixed nerves that carry both sensory and motor information. It also branches to form the grey and the white rami communicantes which make connections with the sympathetic ganglia.

After it is formed, the dorsal ramus of each spinal nerve travels backward, except for the first cervical, the fourth and fifth sacral, and the coccygeal. Dorsal rami divide into medial, intermediate, and lateral branches. The lateral branch supplies innervation to the iliocostalis muscle, as well as the skin lateral to the muscle on the back. The Intermediate branch supplies innervation to the spinalis muscle and the longissimus muscle. The medial branch supplies innervation to the rest of the epaxial derived muscles on the back (including the transversospinales, intertransversarii muscles, interspinalis muscles, suboccipital muscles, and splenius), and the zygapophyseal joints.

== Function ==
Because each spinal nerve carries both sensory and motor information, spinal nerves are referred to as mixed nerves. Posterior rami carry visceral motor, somatic motor, and sensory information to and from the skin and deep muscles of the back. The posterior rami remain distinct from each other, and each innervates a narrow strip of skin and muscle along the back, more or less at the level from which the ramus leaves the spinal nerve.

== Additional images ==
The formation of the spinal nerve from the dorsal and ventral roots.
