= Atlantoaxial ligament =

Atlantoaxial ligament can refer to:

- Anterior atlantoaxial ligament
- Posterior atlantoaxial ligament
