= Jefferson fracture =

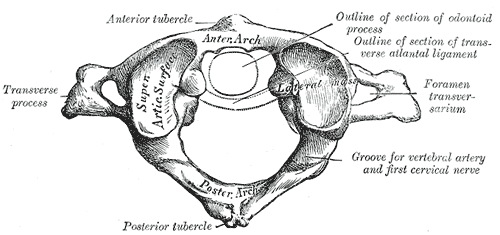
- Image of the first cervical vertebra, which is broken during a Jefferson fracture
- Specialty: Orthopedics

A Jefferson fracture also known as a Jefferson break is a bone fracture of the anterior and posterior arches of the C1 vertebra, though it may also appear as a three- or two-part fracture. The fracture may result from an axial load on the back of the head or hyperextension of the neck (e.g. caused by diving), causing a posterior break, and may be accompanied by a break in other parts of the cervical spine.

It is named after the British neurologist and neurosurgeon Sir Geoffrey Jefferson, who reported four cases of the fracture in 1920 in addition to reviewing cases that had been reported previously.

== Signs and symptoms ==
Individuals with Jefferson fractures usually experience pain in the upper neck but no neurological signs. The fracture may also cause damage to the arteries in the neck, resulting in lateral medullary syndrome, Horner's syndrome, ataxia, and the inability to sense pain or temperature.

In rare cases, congenital abnormality may cause the same symptoms as a Jefferson fracture.

== Cause ==
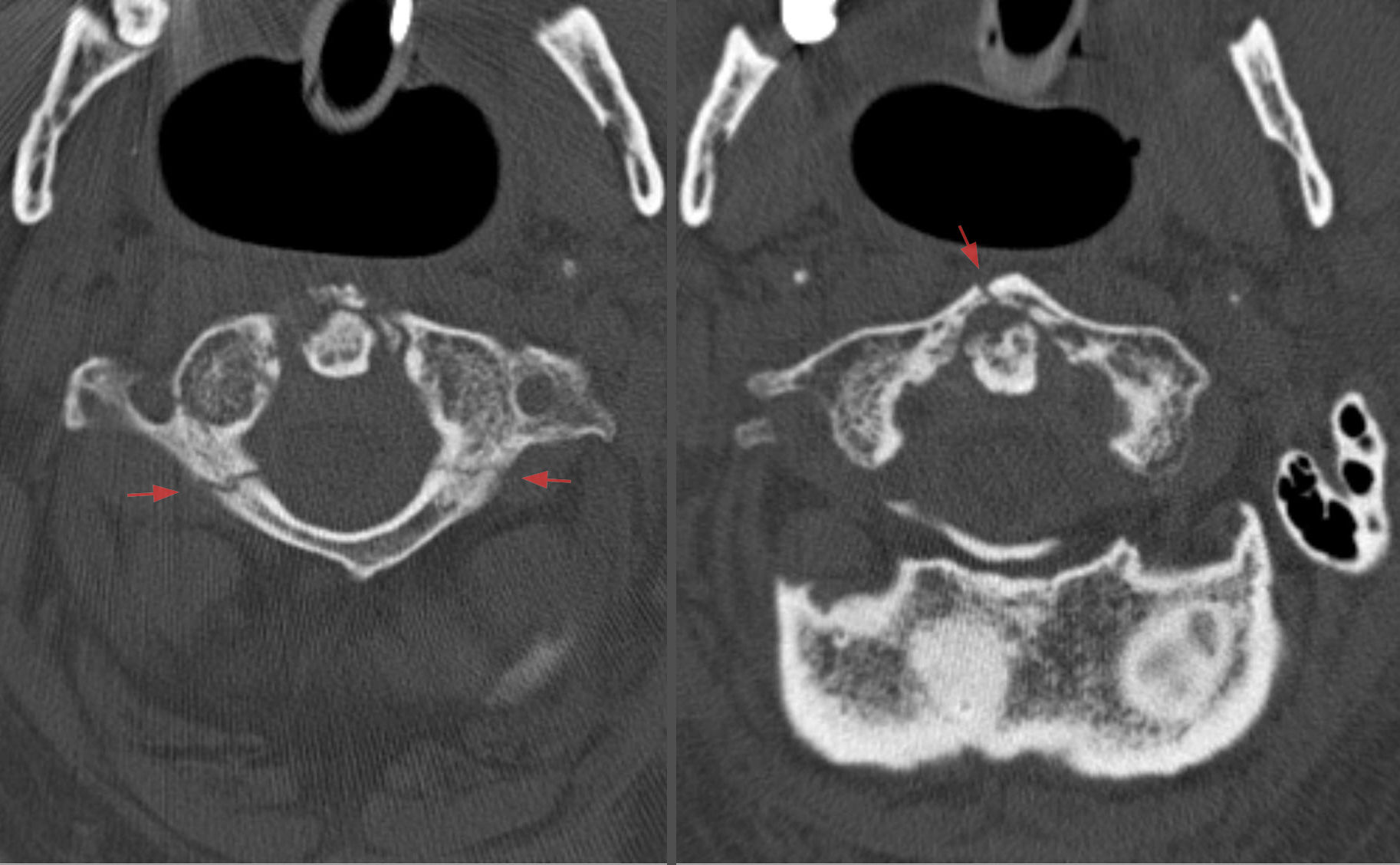
Axial CT scan showing a Jefferson fracture.

Jefferson fracture is often caused by an impact or load on the back of the head, and are frequently associated with diving into shallow water, impact against the roof of a vehicle and falls, and in children may occur due to falls from playground equipment. Less frequently, strong rotation of the head may also result in Jefferson fractures.

Jefferson fractures are extremely rare in children, but recovery is usually complete without surgery.

== Treatment ==
The use of surgery to treat a Jefferson fracture is somewhat controversial. Non-surgical treatment varies depending on if the fracture is stable or unstable, defined by an intact or broken transverse ligament and degree of fracture of the anterior arch. An intact ligament requires the use of a soft or hard collar, while a ruptured ligament may require traction, a halo or surgery. The use of rigid halos can lead to intracranial infections and are often uncomfortable for individuals wearing them, and may be replaced with a more flexible alternative depending on the stability of the injured bones, but treatment of a stable injury with a halo collar can result in a full recovery. Surgical treatment of a Jefferson fracture involves fusion or fixation of the first three cervical vertebrae; fusion may occur immediately, or later during treatment in cases where non-surgical interventions are unsuccessful. A primary factor in deciding between surgical and non-surgical intervention is the degree of stability as well as the presence of damage to other cervical vertebrae.

Though a serious injury, the long-term consequences of a Jefferson's fracture are uncertain and may not impact longevity or abilities, even if untreated. Conservative treatment with an immobilization device can produce excellent long-term recovery.
