= Apical ligament of dens =

Ligament of the spine and skull

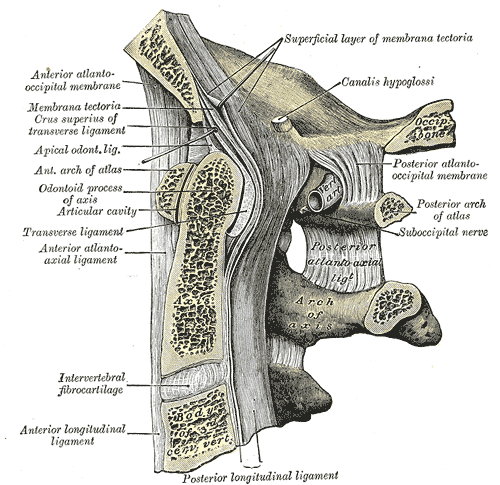
- Median sagittal section through the occipital bone and first three cervical vertebrae (apical ligament of dent labeled at center left as apical odontoid ligament)

Details

Identifiers
- Latin: ligamentum apicis dentis
- TA98: A03.2.04.003
- TA2: 1697
- FMA: 71441

The apical ligament of dens (or apical odontoid ligament) is a ligament that spans between the second cervical vertebra in the neck and the skull. It lies as a fibrous cord in the triangular interval between the alar ligaments, which extends from the tip of the odontoid process on the axis to the anterior margin of the foramen magnum, being intimately blended with the deep portion of the anterior atlantooccipital membrane and superior crus of the transverse ligament of the atlas.

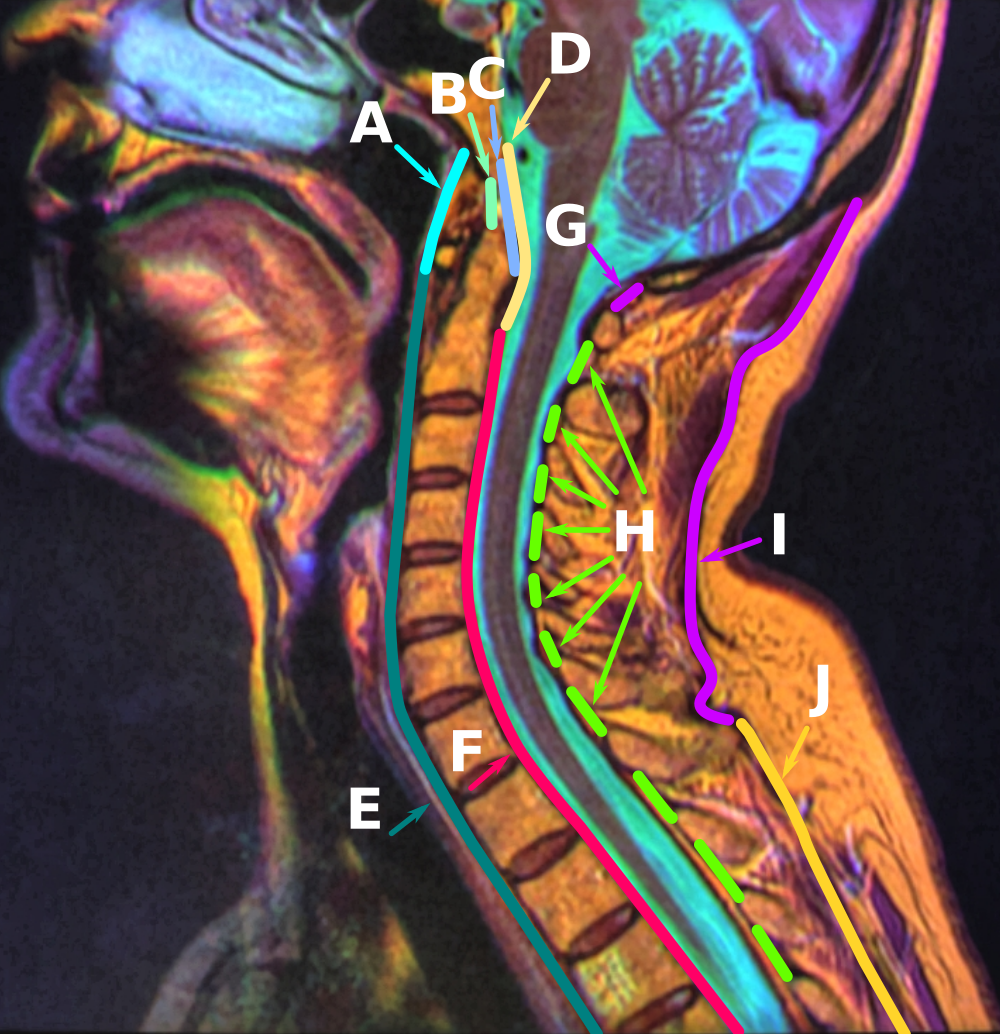
B: Apical ligament of dens

It is regarded as a rudimentary intervertebral fibrocartilage, and in it traces of the notochord may persist.
