= Cruciate ligament of atlas =

Ligament forming part of theatlanto-axial joint

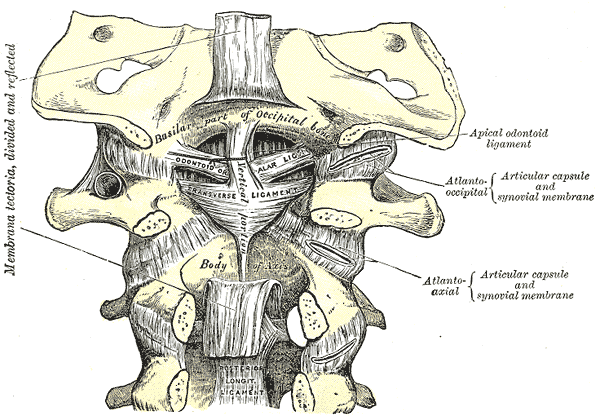
- Membrana tectoria, transverse, and alar ligaments. ("Transverse ligament" and "vertical portion" visible intersecting at center.)

Details
- System: skeletal
- From: medial tubercles of atlas bone (C1), anterior side of foramen magnum of occipital bone of skull, body of axis bone (C2)

Identifiers
- Latin: ligamentum cruciforme atlantis
- TA98: A03.2.04.004
- TA2: 1699
- FMA: 25018

The cruciate ligament of the atlas (cruciform ligament) is a cross-shaped (thus the name) ligament in the neck forming part of the atlanto-axial joint. It consists of the transverse ligament of atlas, a superior longitudinal band, and an inferior longitudinal band.

The cruciate ligament of the atlas prevents abnormal movement of the atlanto-axial joint.

It may be torn, such as by fractures of the atlas bone.

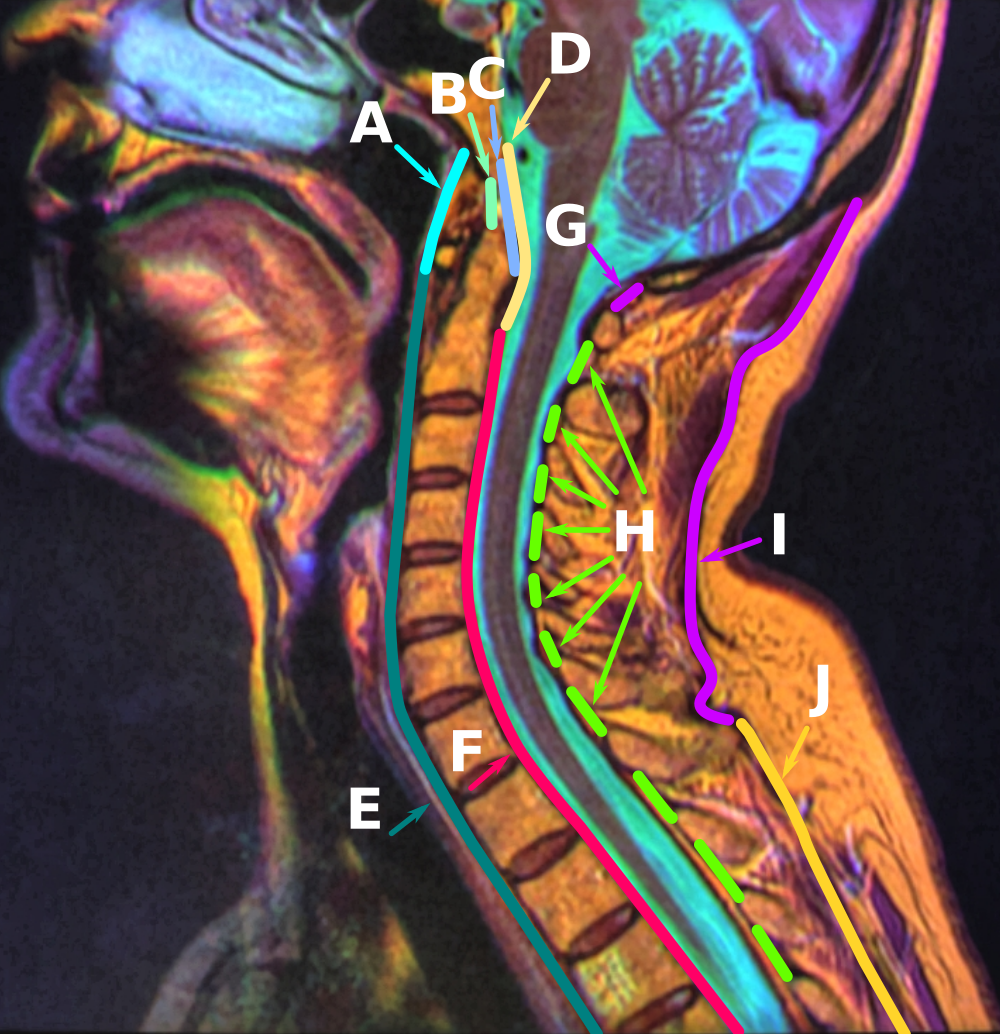
C: Cruciate ligament of atlas

== Structure ==
The cruciate ligament of the atlas consists of the transverse ligament of the atlas, a superior longitudinal band, and an inferior longitudinal band. The superior longitudinal band connects the transverse ligament to the anterior side of the foramen magnum (near the basilar part) in the occipital bone of the skull. The inferior longitudinal band connects the transverse ligament to the body of the axis bone (C2).

=== Variation ===
The inferior longitudinal band may be absent in some people; the rest of the ligament is invariably present.

==== Gerber's ligament ====
In about half of individuals, an additional band - Gerber's ligament - arises at the junction of the transverse ligament and superior band, and is situated deep to the superior band.

== Function ==
The cruciate ligament of the atlas prevents abnormal movements of the atlanto-axial joint. The longitudinal bands prevent hyperflexion and hyperextension of the occipital bone, and hold the transverse ligament of the atlas in a normal position.

== Clinical significance ==
Any part of the cruciate ligament of the atlas may tear, which is a significant injury. This may be caused by fractures of the atlas bone. Ligament tears may be imaged with radiography, a CT scan, or magnetic resonance imaging.

=== Ossification ===
Very rarely, the cruciate ligament of the atlas may ossify. This may lead to cervical myelopathy, that is, damage to the spinal cord.

== Etymology ==
The terms "cruciform" and "cruciate" refer to the cross shape of the ligament. Both terms are frequently used, although the term "cruciate" may be confusing due to confusion with the anterior cruciate ligament and the posterior cruciate ligament of the knee.
