= Ponticulus (disambiguation) =

Ponticulus may refer to:

- Ponticulus, anatomy
- Lasiopogon ponticulus, plant
- Arcuate foramen, anatomic variant
