= Atlanto-axial joint =

Joint in the upper part of the neck

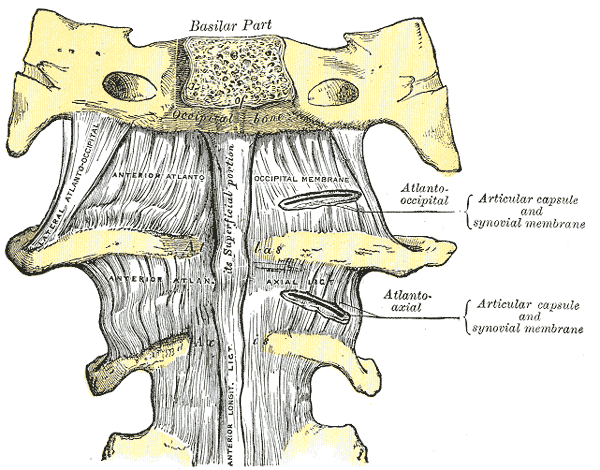
- Anterior atlantooccipital membrane and atlantoaxial ligament

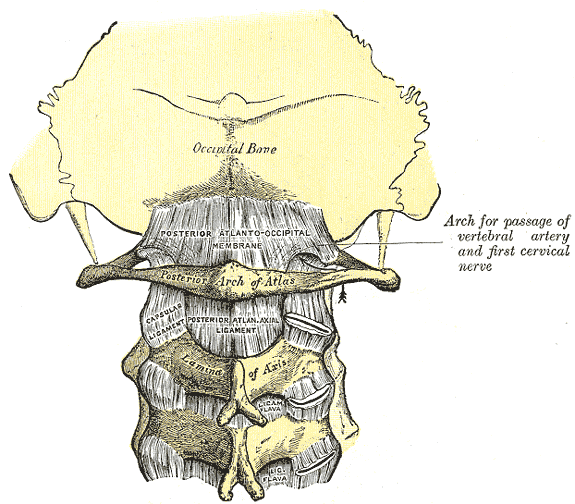
- Posterior atlantooccipital membrane and atlantoaxial ligament

Details
- System: Skeletal

Identifiers
- Latin: articulatio atlantoaxialis mediana, articulatio atlantoaxialis lateralis
- MeSH: D001268
- FMA: 25524

The atlanto-axial joint is a joint in the upper part of the neck between the atlas bone and the axis bone, which are the first and second cervical vertebrae. It is a pivot joint, that can start from C2 To C7.

== Structure ==
The atlanto-axial joint is a joint between the atlas bone and the axis bone, which are the first and second cervical vertebrae. It is a pivot joint that provides 40 to 70% of axial rotation of the head.

There is a pivot articulation between the odontoid process of the axis and the ring formed by the anterior arch and the transverse ligament of the atlas.

=== Lateral and median joints ===
There are three atlanto-axial joints: one median and two lateral:

- The median atlanto-axial joint is sometimes considered a triple joint:
  - one between the posterior surface of the anterior arch of atlas and the front of the odontoid process
  - one between the anterior surface of the ligament and the back of the odontoid process
- The lateral atlantoaxial joint involves the lateral mass of atlas and axis. Between the articular processes of the two bones there is on either side an arthrodial or gliding joint.

=== Ligaments ===
The ligaments connecting these bones are:

- Articular capsules
- Anterior atlantoaxial ligament
- Posterior atlantoaxial ligament
- Transverse ligament of the atlas

=== Capsule ===
The atlantoaxial articular capsules are thick and loose, and connect the margins of the lateral masses of the atlas with those of the posterior articular surfaces of the axis.

Each is strengthened at its posterior and medial part by an accessory ligament, which is attached below to the body of the axis near the base of the odontoid process, and above to the lateral mass of the atlas near the transverse ligament.

== Clinical significance ==
Because of its proximity to the brain stem and importance in stabilization, fracture or injury to the atlanto-axial joint can cause serious problems. Common trauma and pathologies include (but are not limited to):

The dens: significant depression on the skull can push the dens into the brainstem, causing death. The dens itself is vulnerable to fracture due to trauma or ossification.

Transverse ligament: Should the transverse ligament of the atlas fail due to trauma or disease, the dens is no longer anchored and can travel up the cervical spine, causing paralysis. If it reaches the medulla death can result. Alar ligaments: stress or trauma can stretch the weaker alar ligaments, causing an increase in range of motion of approximately 30%.

Posterior atlanto-occipital membrane: genetic traits can sometimes result in ossification, turning the groove into a foramen.

=== Arthritis ===
Osteoarthritis may occur at the atlanto-axial joint. This involves classic pathophysiology, such as loss of articular cartilage, osteophytes visible with radiography, and bone thickening with a narrow joint space. Conservative management is usually effective, involving analgesics. Surgery may be used in severe cases, and may have good outcomes.

=== Abnormal widening ===
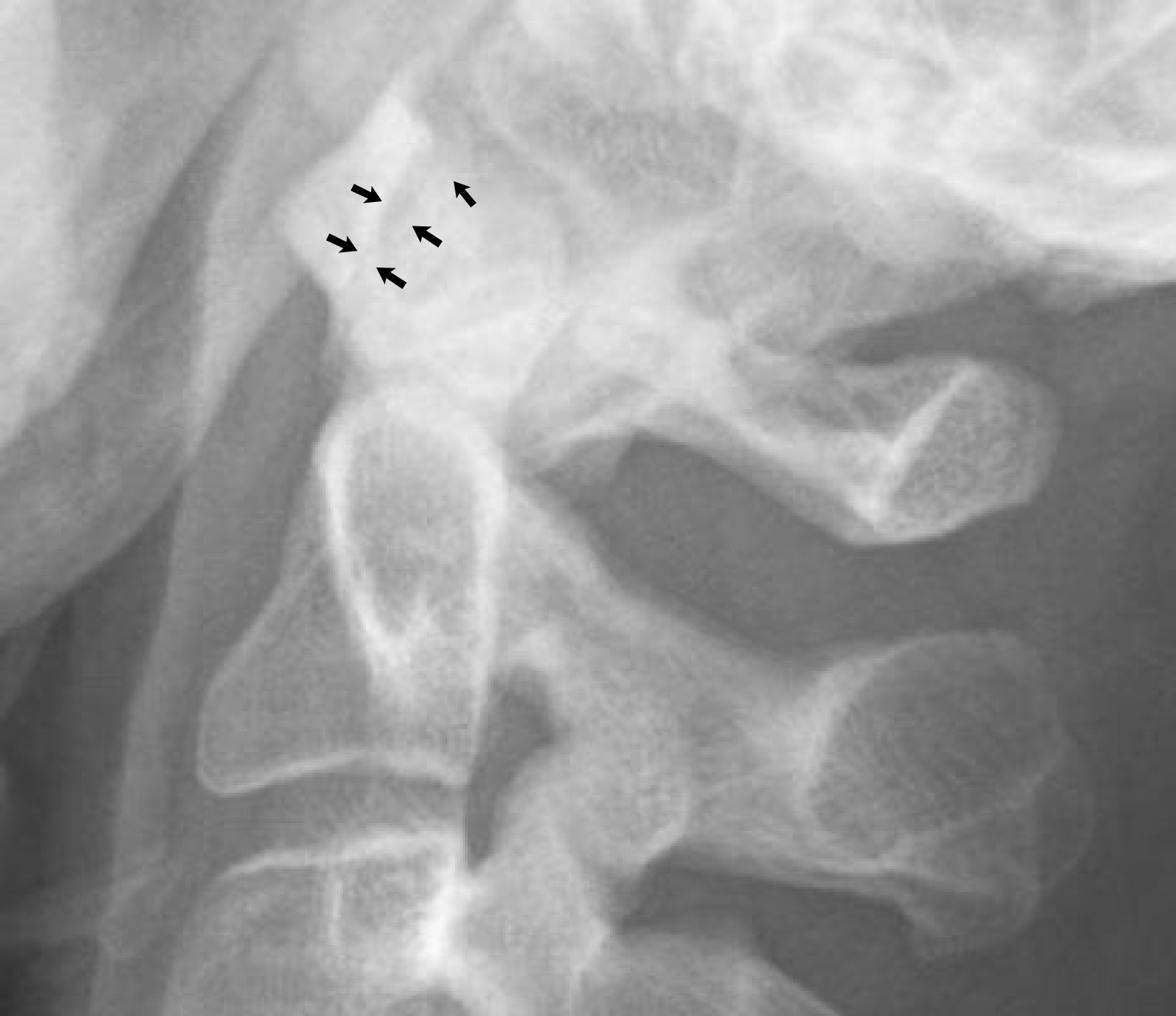
Normal atlanto-dental joint on projectional radiography.

A widening of the atlanto-axial joint, as measured between the posterior surface of the anterior arch of atlas and the front of the odontoid process, indicates an injury to the transverse atlantal ligament. Normally, this atlanto-dental distance is less than 2 mm, sometimes a maximum of 3 mm is accepted in men and 2.5 mm in women.

== Bibliography ==
- Dalley, Arthur F; Moore, Keith L. Clinically Oriented Anatomy Fourth Edition. Baltimore. Lippincott Williams & Wilkins, 1992.
- Saladin, Kenneth S. Anatomy &Physiology: the Unity of Form and Function. New York. McGraw Hill, 2007.
