= Atlantooccipital membrane =

Atlantooccipital membrane can refer to:

- Anterior atlantooccipital membrane
- Posterior atlantooccipital membrane
