= Cybermed =

South Korean technology company

Cybermed Inc.
- Type: Private
- Industry: Medical 3D imaging software
- Founded: 1998; 28 years agoSeoul, South Korea
- Founder: Kim Cheol-Young
- Headquarters: Seoul, South Korea 37.4792°N 126.8846°E; Irvine, California
- Area served: Worldwide
- Products: OnDemand3D; In2Guide; EasyRiter; Replica Service; V-Works (discont.); CB-Works (discont.)
- Website: ondemand3d.com

Cybermed Inc. (Korean: 사이버메드), located in Seoul, South Korea, has been active in the field of 3D image processing and dental software since its conception in 1998. Its U.S. counterpart, OnDemand3D Technology Inc., is currently headquartered in Irvine, California.

== History ==
Cybermed was founded by Kim Cheol-Young in 1998 in Seoul, South Korea. Since its founding, Cybermed has become the first in the world to introduce cone beam CT image processing software as well as first in Korea to develop a rapid prototyping system, 3D medical imaging software and an implant planning software. The company introduced OnDemand3D, a diagnostic imaging software used for 2D/3D diagnosis in 2007, and In2Guide, an implant planning add-on to OnDemand3D as a stand-alone package, with surgical stent/template ordering capabilities in 2010. EasyRiter, a software for generating reports and referrals from CBCT results was introduced in 2013 with the help of Dr. Robert Danforth and Dr. Dale A. Miles.

== Software ==
OnDemand3D
- Stable release: 2013 (1.0.9) / May 23, 2013; 13 years ago
- Written in: C/C++, MFC
- Operating system: Microsoft Windows
- Available in: 8 languages
- Type: 3D Image Processing Software
- License: Proprietary Software
- Website: www.ondemand3d.com

=== OnDemand3D ===
Having had popular predecessors such as V-Works (2000) and CB-Works (2004), OnDemand3D was introduced in 2006 as a 'complete dental imaging solution'. It is a 3D image processing software written in C/C++ on MFC available in English, French, Spanish, German, Russian, Japanese, Polish and Portuguese. It is a module-based software, where the user can customize according to their diagnostic or research needs.

OnDemand3D is sold in two main packages; one being OnDemand3D App and the other being OnDemand3D Dental. The difference is in the modules included, briefly summarized in the table below.

Module	Functions	App	Dental
DBM	DICOM management, Data search, CD/DVD/USB writer, import/export from server, PACS server integration	Yes	Yes
Report	'Capture' from any module and make a quick & simple report; Export as HTML file	Yes	Yes
X-Report	For a more advanced option: Design custom report templates to increase efficiency	Yes	Yes
Dynamic Lightbox	Slice view, Oblique slice view, 3D Zoom, Virtual endoscopy, etc.	Yes	No
Dental Volume Reformat	Implant planning, Panoramic views, Implant verification, TMJ view, Occlusion view, etc.	Yes	No
Dental	Implant planning, TMJ analysis, 3D Zoom, Nerve tracing	No	Yes
3D	TMJ, Condyle diagnosis, Airway View, Teeth & Roots, 3D Zoom, 3D Segmentation, DICOM to STL conversion	Yes	Add-on
Fusion	Superimposition, Pre-op and post-op comparison, Stitching DICOM data	Yes	Add-on
3D Ceph	Cephalometry, Measurements, Landmark tracing, Superimposition, Pre-op and post-op comparisons, 2D photo mapping, X-ray image generator	Add-on	Add-on
X-Image	2D image management, Multi format file management, Direct acquisition from configured scanner, Launcher integration	Add-on	Add-on
In2Guide	Implant planning, Order your custom surgical template and surgical drill kits online (Also sold as a stand-alone)	Add-on	Add-on

In2Guide Pro
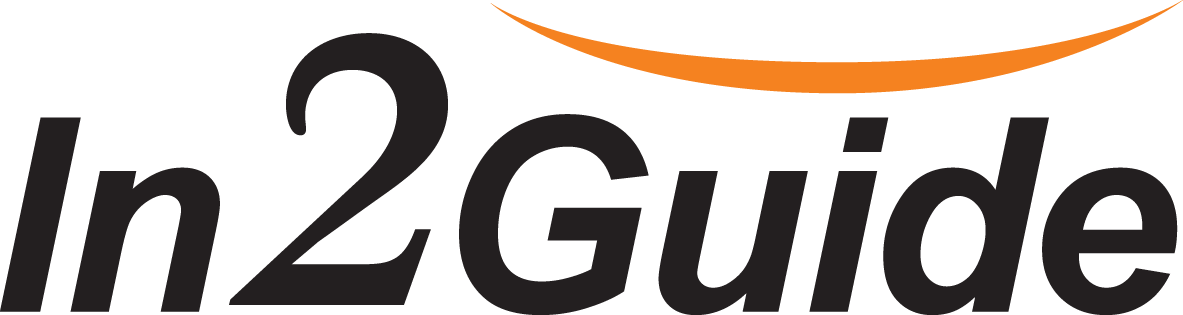
- Stable release: 2013 (1.0.9) / May 23, 2013; 13 years ago
- Written in: C/C++, MFC
- Operating system: Microsoft Windows
- Available in: 8 languages
- Type: 3D Imaging & Processing Software
- License: Proprietary Software
- Website: www.in2guide.eu

=== In2Guide ===
Originally an optional add-on to OnDemand3D, In2Guide was introduced as stand-alone In2Guide Pro and In2Guide Planner at the end of 2009. It is built on the same platform and also still available as an add-on. In2Guide's main function is the planning of a surgical stent or template to be used for guided implant surgery.

Guided implant surgery is implant surgery performed with the help of a 'guide' or surgical template that is designed by combining patient CT scans with careful planning on a 3D imaging software such as In2Guide. In2Guide is used to virtually place implants and assess the prosthetic results before surgery. Research suggests that computerized planning can help ensure that the implant is placed in the best bone volume, leading to the 'best possible restorative outcome'. The surgical template that is designed with the planned images then allows for a precise reproduction of that positioning with the use of custom sleeves that dictate both the angle and depth of the needed drilling.

On In2Guide, after the surgery is planned, users fill out a form for template fabrication. The 'planning images' are uploaded by the user and a fabricated template with the appropriate sleeves and drilling instructions is shipped out, usually to reach the customer within a few days.

In2Guide Pro is intended for advanced users such as clinics, labs, and imaging centers which have a CT machine, an intra-oral scanner or a 3D scanner, while In2Guide Planner is a much more basic version that only allows implant planning, with the other steps usually being outsourced for an additional fee.

EasyRiter
- Stable release: 2013 (1.0.10)
- Written in: C/C++, MFC
- Operating system: Microsoft Windows
- License: Proprietary Software
- Website: www.easyriter.com

=== EasyRiter ===
EasyRiter is a CBCT reporting program co-developed with Dr. Dale A. Miles and Dr. Robert Danforth. It uses a simple template format where the user selects appropriate statements from a ready list in each of the anatomic areas. Pop-up descriptions with illustrations are included to help the user choose the correct description of an anomaly or lesion if found in the CBCT volume. EasyRiter also utilizes flexera licensing.

== Applications ==
The products at Cybermed are used largely by dentists, orthodontists, radiologists, oral and maxillofacial surgeons, GPs, periodontists and other specialists.

Some more specific applications of Cybermed software found in literature:

- "Separating brain tissue on the MR images from non-brain tissue for a whole volumetric measurement of the brain and cerebellum" [OnDemand3d - 3D Module]
- "Examining specific structures in the craniofacial area by reproducing actual measurements through minimization of errors from patient movement and image magnification" [V-Works]
- "Investigating the prevalence of ponticulus posticus through a 3D image reconstruction" [V-Works]
- "Investigating the prevalence and morphologic classification of distolingual roots in the mandibular molars using cross-sectional images and 3D reconstructions of molars" [OnDemand3D - 3D Module]
- "Measuring sub-regional volumes in the cerebellum using 3D MRI volumetry and comparing the volumes of cerebellar hemispheres and vermian lobules" [V-Works: Measuring ROI]
- "Three-dimensional analysis of volumetric airway change in orthognathic surgery of mandibular prognathism" [V-works]
- "Measuring the thickness of buccal and palatal plate, root diameter, curvature angle of buccal bone below root apex and distance from root apex to the deepest point of buccal bone curvature on each maxillary anterior teeth" [OnDemand3D - DVR]
- "A pilot study on the influence of diabetes mellitus on periodontal tissues" [OnDemand3D]
- "Investigating the relationship between grey levels and linear attenuation coefficients in order to derive Hounsfield units in CBCT" [OnDemand3D]
