= Abyssobrotula hadropercularis =

Conservation status
- Data Deficient (IUCN 3.1)

Scientific classification
- Kingdom: Animalia
- Phylum: Chordata
- Class: Actinopterygii
- Order: Ophidiiformes
- Family: Ophidiidae
- Genus: Abyssobrotula
- Species: A. hadropercularis

Binomial name
- Abyssobrotula hadropercularis Ohashi & J. G. Nielsen, 2016

Species of fish

Abyssobrotula hadropercularis is a species of cusk eel in the family Ophidiidae.

== Etymology ==
The word 'Abyssobrotula' comes from 'abyssos', which means 'deep' or 'depth' in Greek, and 'brotula', which means 'little bud' or 'shoot' in Latin. The word 'hadropercularis' comes from 'hadros' meaning bulky, and 'opercularis', meaning gill cover, in reference to the robust opercle.

== Distribution ==
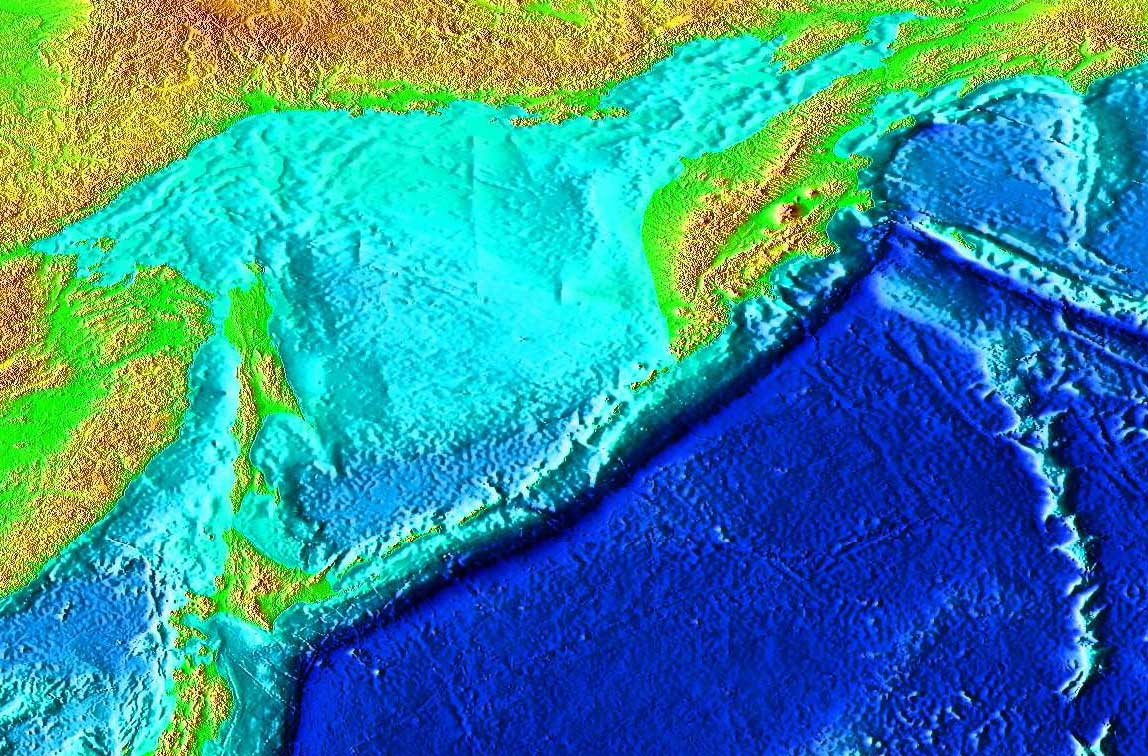
Kuril-Kamchatka Trench, where the only two specimens of A. hadropercularis was found

This species is found in the Kuril-Kamchatka Trench, Northwest Pacific Ocean.

== Description ==
Maximum length of male or unsexed Abyssobrotula hadropercularis is 14.9 cm (5.9 in) and female is 20 cm (7.9 in). The gill rakers on anterior arch are robust and close-set. The opercular spines are strongly developed. This species has 14–15 pectoral-fin rays.

== Environment ==
It is bathypelagic, subtropical fish. Its depth range is 5,179 to 5,223 m (16,990 to 17,140 ft).

== See also ==
- Abyssobrotula galatheae
