= Lasiopogon =

Lasiopogon is the scientific name of two genera of organisms and may refer toL

- Lasiopogon (fly), a genus of insects in the family Asilidae
- Lasiopogon (plant), a genus of plants in the family Asteraceae
