= Occipital condyles =

Undersurface protuberances of the occipital bone in vertebrates

- Occipital bone. Outer surface. Occipital condyles are shown in red.

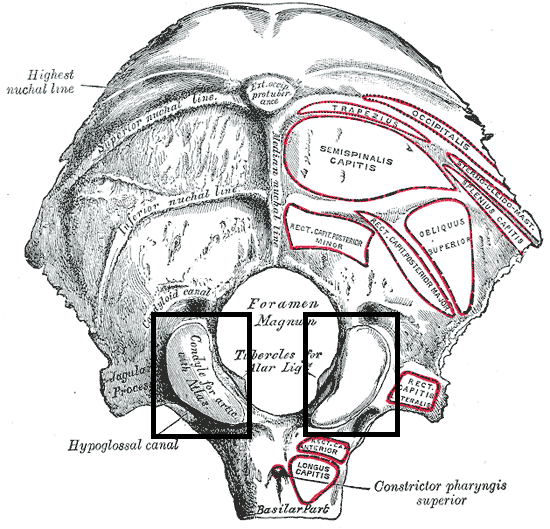
- Occipital bone. Outer surface. (Condyle for artic. with atlas labeled at lower left.)

Details

Identifiers
- Latin: condylus occipitalis
- TA98: A02.1.04.014
- TA2: 557
- FMA: 52861

The occipital condyles are undersurface protuberances of the occipital bone in vertebrates, which function in articulation with the superior facets of the atlas vertebra.

The condyles are oval or reniform in shape, and their anterior extremities, directed forward and medialward, are closer together than their posterior, and encroach on the basilar portion of the bone; the posterior extremities extend back to the level of the middle of the foramen magnum.

The articular surfaces of the condyles are convex from before backward and from side to side, and look downward and lateralward.

To their margins are attached the capsules of the atlanto-occipital joints, and on the medial side of each is a rough impression or tubercle for the alar ligament.

At the base of either condyle the bone is tunnelled by a short canal, the hypoglossal canal.

== Clinical significance ==
Fracture of an occipital condyle may occur in isolation, or as part of a more extended basilar skull fracture. Isolated condyle fracture is a type of craniocervical injury. The classification of Anderson and Montesano distinguishes three types of occipital condyle fracture:

- Type I: Isolated impaction fracture of the occipital condyle, due to compression by the atlas or dens. This injury is usually stable; significant displacement of fragments is rare.
- Type II: Occipital basilar skull fracture extending into the condyle, resulting from direct trauma. The craniocervical junction usually stays stable, but neurologic injury may occur from the blow to the head.
- Type III: Isolated avulsion of the condyle with displacement towards the alar ligament, due to forced rotation / lateral bending. This injury tends to be unstable and may co-occur with atlanto-occipital subluxation or dislocation. Neurological injury may occur and range from minor to instantly fatal.

Minimally displaced fractures are treated conservatively. Surgery may become necessary if there is significant compression of the brainstem, spinal cord, the lower cranial nerves or cervical arteries. Bilateral condyle fractures (e.g. as part of an atlanto-occipital dislocation or the "occipital ring fracture") are rare, but often fatal.

Symptoms of an isolated occipital condyle fracture resemble those of other craniocervical injuries, including high cervical pain, reduced range of motion, unusual head / neck posture, prevertebral swelling, and possibly lower cranial nerve (IX, X, XI, XII) deficits, tetraparesis or abnormal breathing. Among these, cranial nerve deficits are the most characteristic due to the proximity of the injury to the jugular foramen and hypoglossal canal. Onset of neurologic symptoms may be immediate or delayed.

The prevalence of occipital condyle fractures is not definitely known. Once thought to be a rare injury, it is nowadays believed to constitute 1-3% of all blunt craniocervical traumas. It is most commonly seen in high-energy trauma, often associated with other skull and/or cervical spine injuries.

== In reptiles and birds ==
The presence of a single occipital condyle in dinosaurs (including birds) and crocodilians contrasts with the condition in amphibians and synapsids (including mammals such as Homo sapiens), where two occipital condyles are present. Here, the occipital condyle is a single rounded projection that is present on the rear of the skull and articulates with the first cervical (neck) vertebra. Functionally, it allows the head to move from side to side, up and down, as well as to rotate. A combination of a number of smaller bones (such as the basioccipital and exoccipitals) participate in the formation of this structure.

In most dinosaurs, the occipital condyle is situated at the rear part of the skull, below the foramen magnum, and points toward the posterior of the animal. Some exceptions to this exist, such as in the iguanodontian Anabisetia saldiviai where the condyle points downward. In some dinosaurs, where the skull has not been preserved, the presence of a small occipital condyle suggests to some paleontologists that the skull of the dinosaur was relatively small.

== See also ==
- Atlas
- Condyloid fossa
