= Atlas joint =

Atlas joint may refer to:

- Atlanto-axial joint
- Atlanto-occipital joint
