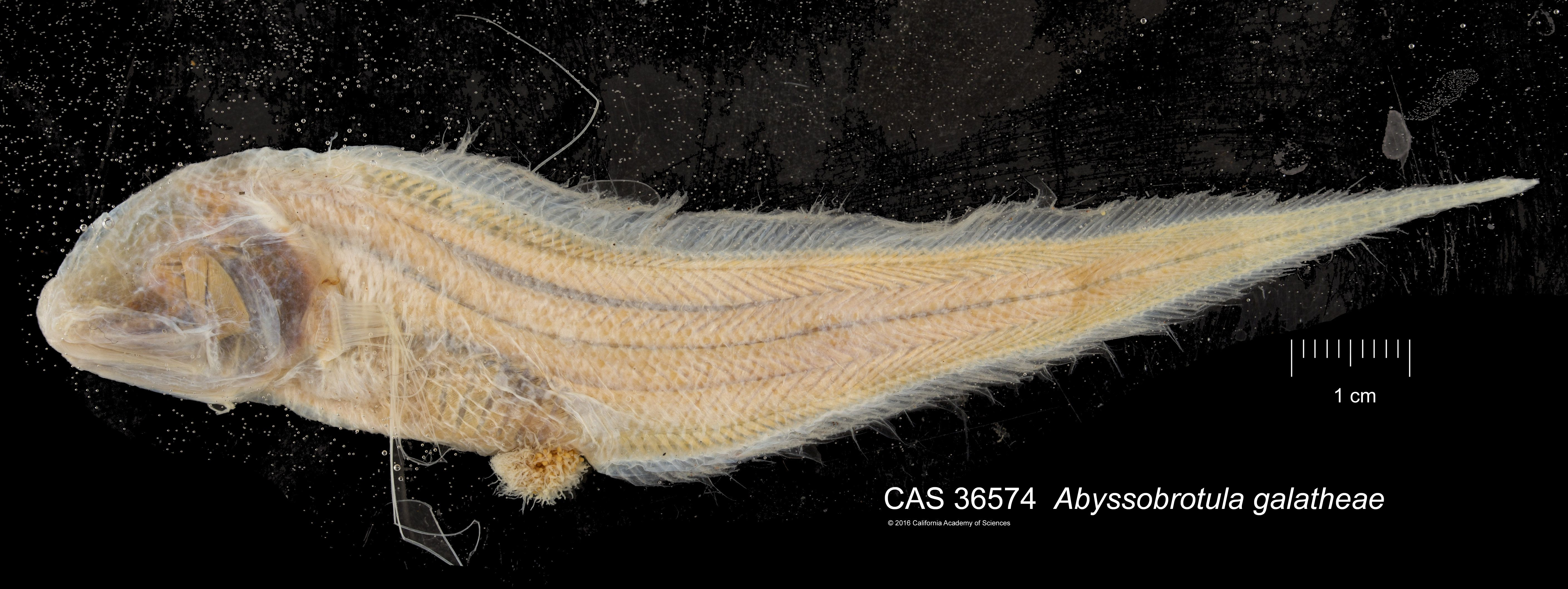
- Abyssobrotula galatheae

Scientific classification
- Kingdom: Animalia
- Phylum: Chordata
- Class: Actinopterygii
- Order: Ophidiiformes
- Family: Ophidiidae
- Subfamily: Neobythitinae
- Genus: Abyssobrotula; J. G. Nielsen, 1977

Type species
- Abyssobrotula galatheae Nielsen, 1977

= Abyssobrotula =

Genus of fishes

Abyssobrotula is a genus of cusk eel in the family Ophidiidae.

== Species ==
There are currently 2 recognized species in this genus:

- Abyssobrotula galatheae J. G. Nielsen, 1977
- Abyssobrotula hadropercularis Ohashi & J. G. Nielsen, 2016
