= Anterior atlantoaxial ligament =

Ligament of the spine

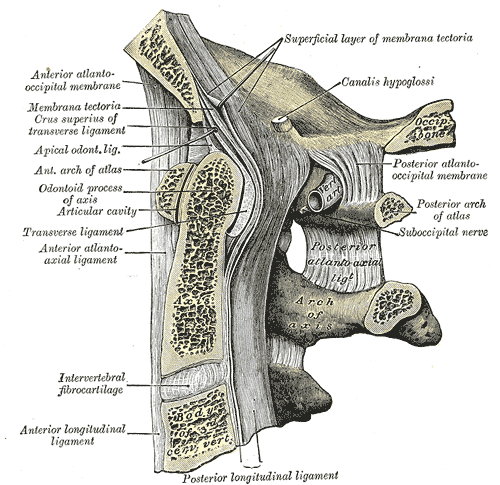
- Median sagittal section through the occipital bone and first three cervical vertebrae

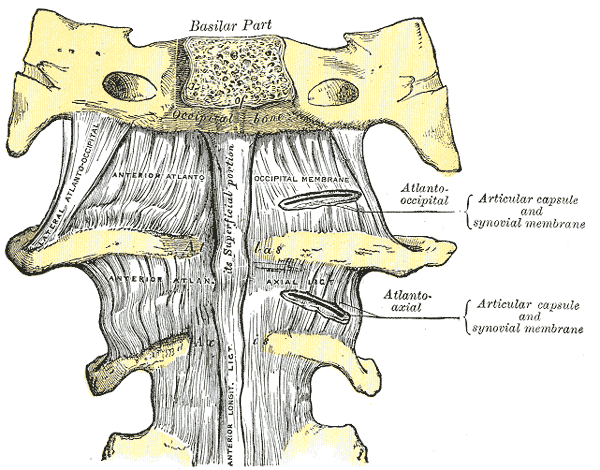
- Anterior atlantooccipital membrane and atlantoaxial ligament.

Details

Identifiers
- Latin: ligamentum atlantoaxialis anterius
- TA2: 1672

The anterior atlantoaxial ligament is a strong membrane, fixed above the lower border of the anterior arch of the atlas; below, to the front of the body of the axis.

It is strengthened in the middle line by a rounded cord, which connects the tubercle on the anterior arch of the atlas to the body of the axis. It is a continuation upward of the anterior longitudinal ligament.

== Structure ==
=== Anatomical relations ===
The anterior atlantoaxial ligament is situated anterior to the longus capitis muscle.

== See also ==
- Atlanto-axial joint
