= Posterior atlantoaxial ligament =

Body part

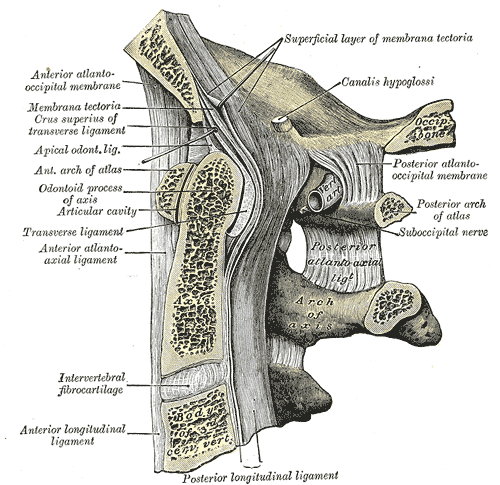
- Median sagittal section through the occipital bone and first three cervical vertebræ

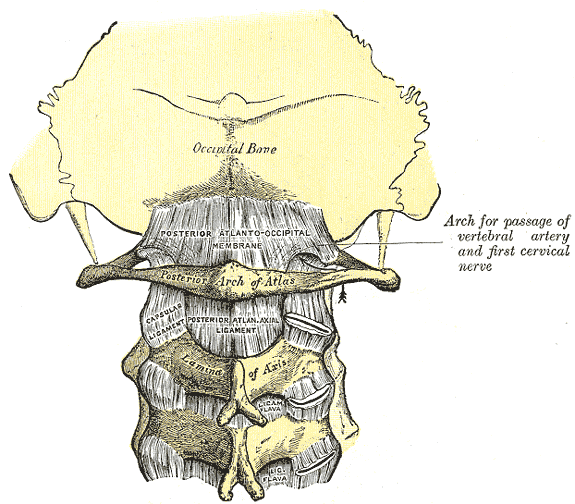
- Posterior atlantooccipital membrane and atlantoaxial ligament.

Details

Identifiers
- Latin: ligamentum atlantoaxialis posterius
- TA2: 1673

The posterior atlantoaxial ligament is a broad, thin membrane attached, above, to the lower border of the posterior arch of the atlas; below, to the upper edges of the laminæ of the axis.

It supplies the place of the ligamenta flava, and is in relation, behind, with the obliqui capitis inferiores.

== See also ==
- Atlanto-axial joint
