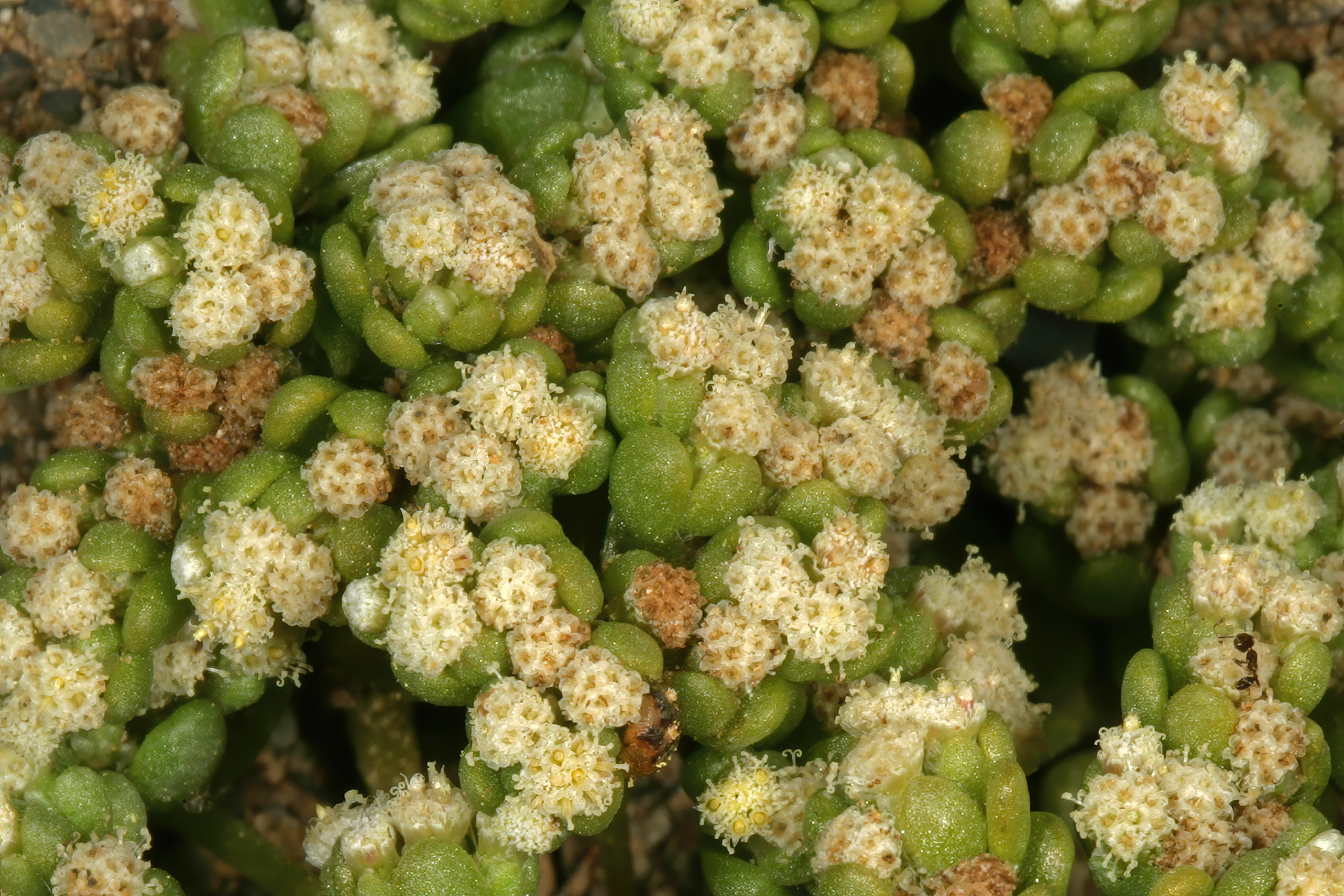
- Lasiopogon debilis, plant in flower

Scientific classification
- Kingdom: Plantae
- Clade: Tracheophytes
- Clade: Angiosperms
- Clade: Eudicots
- Clade: Asterids
- Order: Asterales
- Family: Asteraceae
- Subfamily: Asteroideae
- Tribe: Gnaphalieae
- Genus: Lasiopogon; Cass.

Type species
- Gnaphalium muscoides Desf.

= Lasiopogon (plant) =

Genus of flowering plants

Lasiopogon is a genus of flowering plants in the family Asteraceae native to Southern Africa.

Species

- Lasiopogon brachypterus O.Hoffm. ex Zahlbr.
- Lasiopogon debilis (Thunb.) Hilliard
- Lasiopogon glomeratus Hilliard
- Lasiopogon glomerulatus (Harv.) Hilliard
- Lasiopogon micropoides DC.
- Lasiopogon minutus (B.Nord.) Hilliard & B.L.Burtt
- Lasiopogon muscoides (Desf.) DC.
- Lasiopogon ponticulus Hilliard
- Lasiopogon volkii (B.Nord.) Hilliard
