= Lasiopogon ponticulus =

Conservation status
- Least Concern (IUCN 3.1)

Scientific classification
- Kingdom: Plantae
- Clade: Tracheophytes
- Clade: Angiosperms
- Clade: Eudicots
- Clade: Asterids
- Order: Asterales
- Family: Asteraceae
- Genus: Lasiopogon
- Species: L. ponticulus

Binomial name
- Lasiopogon ponticulus Hilliard

Species of flowering plant

Lasiopogon ponticulus is a species of flowering plant in the family Asteraceae. It is found only in Namibia. Its natural habitat is cold desert. It is threatened by habitat loss.
