= Anterior longitudinal ligament =

Ligament running down the front of the vertebral column

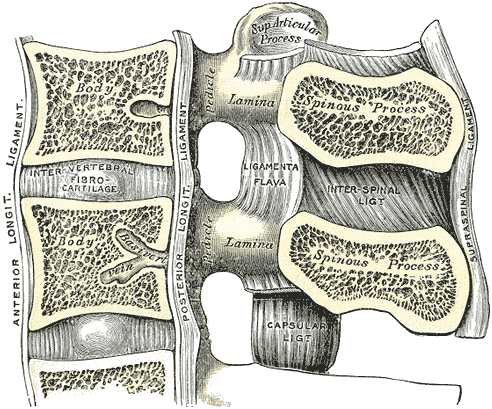
- Median sagittal section of two lumbar vertebræ and their ligaments. (Anterior longitudinal ligament runs vertically at center left.)

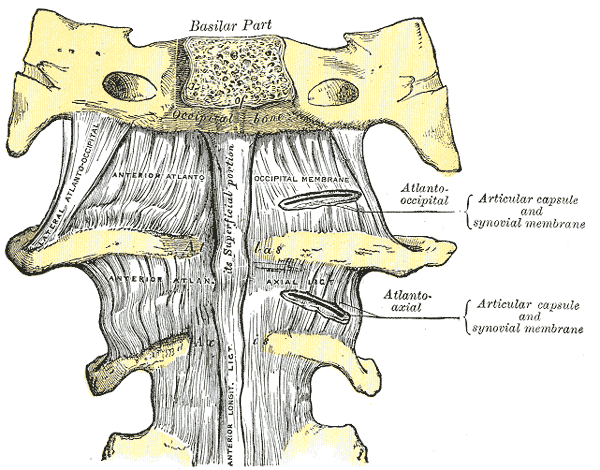
- Anterior atlantooccipital membrane and atlantoaxial ligament. (Anterior longitudinal ligament runs vertically at bottom center.)

Details
- System: skeletal
- From: inferior basilar portion of occipital bone
- To: sacrum

Identifiers
- Latin: ligamentum longitudinale anterius
- TA98: A03.2.01.007
- TA2: 1679
- FMA: 31893

The anterior longitudinal ligament is a ligament that extends across the anterior/ventral aspect of the vertebral bodies and intervertebral discs in the spine.

It may be partially cut to treat certain abnormal curvatures in the vertebral column, such as kyphosis.

== Anatomy ==
The anterior longitudinal ligament extends superoinferiorly between the basiocciput of the skull and the anterior tubercle of the atlas (cervical vertebra C1) superiorly, and the superior part of the sacrum inferiorly; inferiorly, it ends at the sacral promontory. It broadens inferiorly. Inferiorly, it becomes continuous with the anterior sacrococcygeal ligament. Superiorly, between the skull and atlas, the ligament is continuous laterally with the anterior atlantooccipital membrane.

The ligament is thick and slightly more narrow over the vertebral bodies and thinner but slightly wider over the intervertebral discs.

It tends to be narrower and thicker around thoracic vertebrae, and wider and thinner around cervical vertebrae and lumbar vertebrae.

=== Structure ===
The anterior longitudinal ligament adheres strongly to the periosteum of the vertebral bodies, but is less strongly connected with the intervertebral discs.

It has three layers: superficial, intermediate and deep. The superficial layer traverses 3 – 4 vertebrae, the intermediate layer covers 2 – 3 and the deep layer is only between individual vertebrae.

== Clinical significance ==
The anterior longitudinal ligament may become calcified, causing back pain.

=== Surgical release ===
The anterior longitudinal ligament may be "released", or partially cut, between two adjacent vertebrae. This may be done to treat abnormal curvature in the vertebral column, such as kyphosis. Osteoporosis, some infections, and past back surgery may prevent this surgery.

== Additional images ==
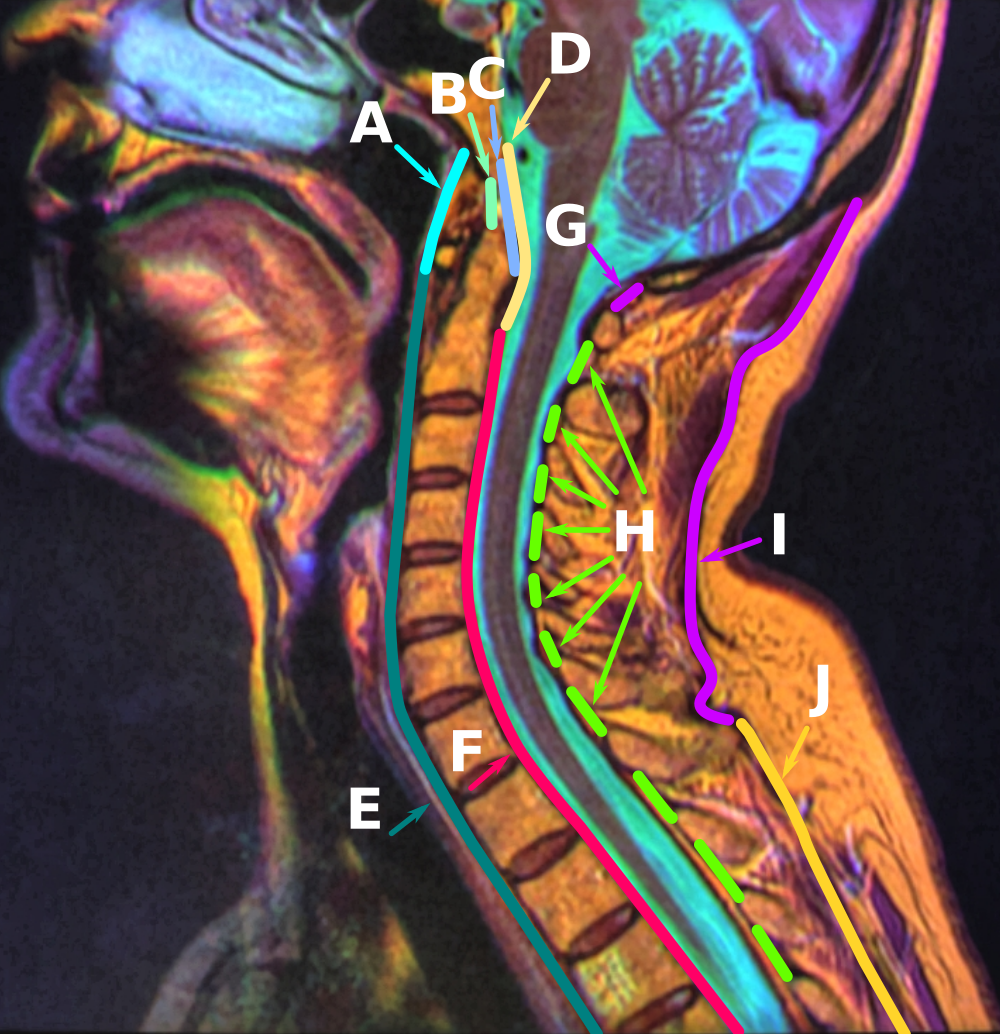
E:Anterior longitudinal ligament

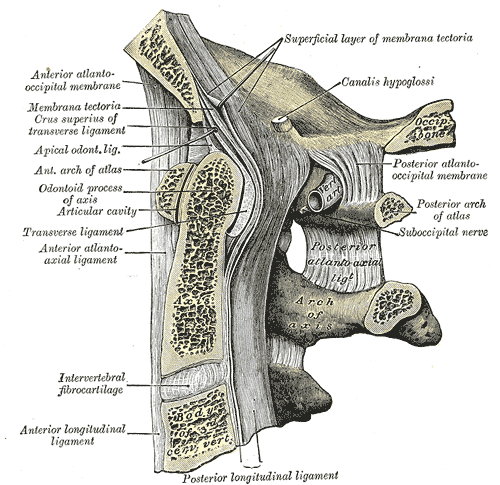
Median sagittal section through the occipital bone and first three cervical vertebræ.

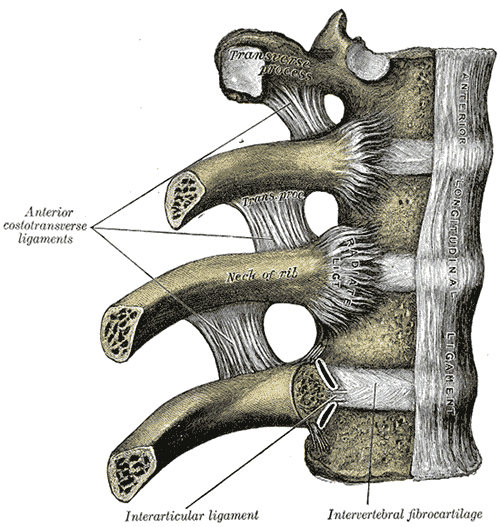
Costovertebral articulations. Anterior view.

== See also ==
- Intervertebral disc
- Posterior longitudinal ligament
