= Axial loading =

Force on a structure along an axis

Axial loading is defined as applying a force on a structure directly along a given axis of said structure. In the medical field, the term refers to the application of weight or force along the course of the long axis of the body. The application of an axial load on the human spine can result in vertebral compression fractures. Axial loading takes place during the practice of head-carrying, an activity which a prospective case–control study in 2020 shows leads to "accelerated degenerative changes, which involve the upper cervical spine more than the lower cervical spine and predisposes it to injury at a lower threshold."
