= Anterior atlantooccipital membrane =

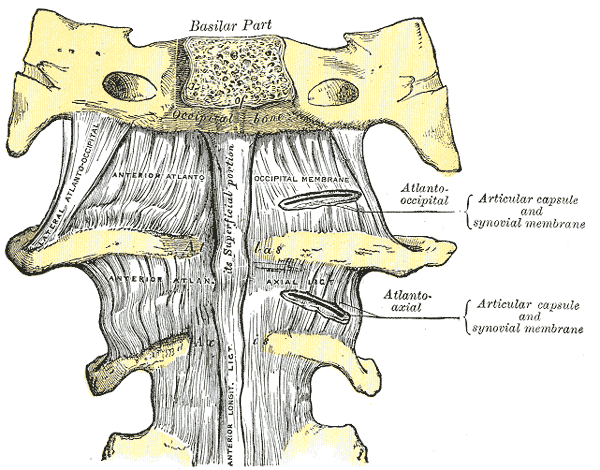
- Anterior atlantooccipital membrane and atlantoaxial ligament

Details

Identifiers
- Latin: membrana atlantooccipitalis anterior
- TA98: A03.1.08.002
- TA2: 1631
- FMA: 25005

The anterior atlantooccipital membrane (anterior atlantooccipital ligament) is a broad, dense membrane extending between the anterior margin of the foramen magnum (superiorly), and (the superior margin of) the anterior arch of atlas (inferiorly).

The membrane helps limit excessive movement at the atlanto-occipital joints.

== Anatomy ==
=== Structure ===
It is composed of broad, densely woven fibers; especially towards the midline where the membrane is continuous medially with the anterior longitudinal ligament. It is innervated by the cervical spinal nerve 1.

=== Relations ===
Medially, it is continuous with the anterior longitudinal ligament.

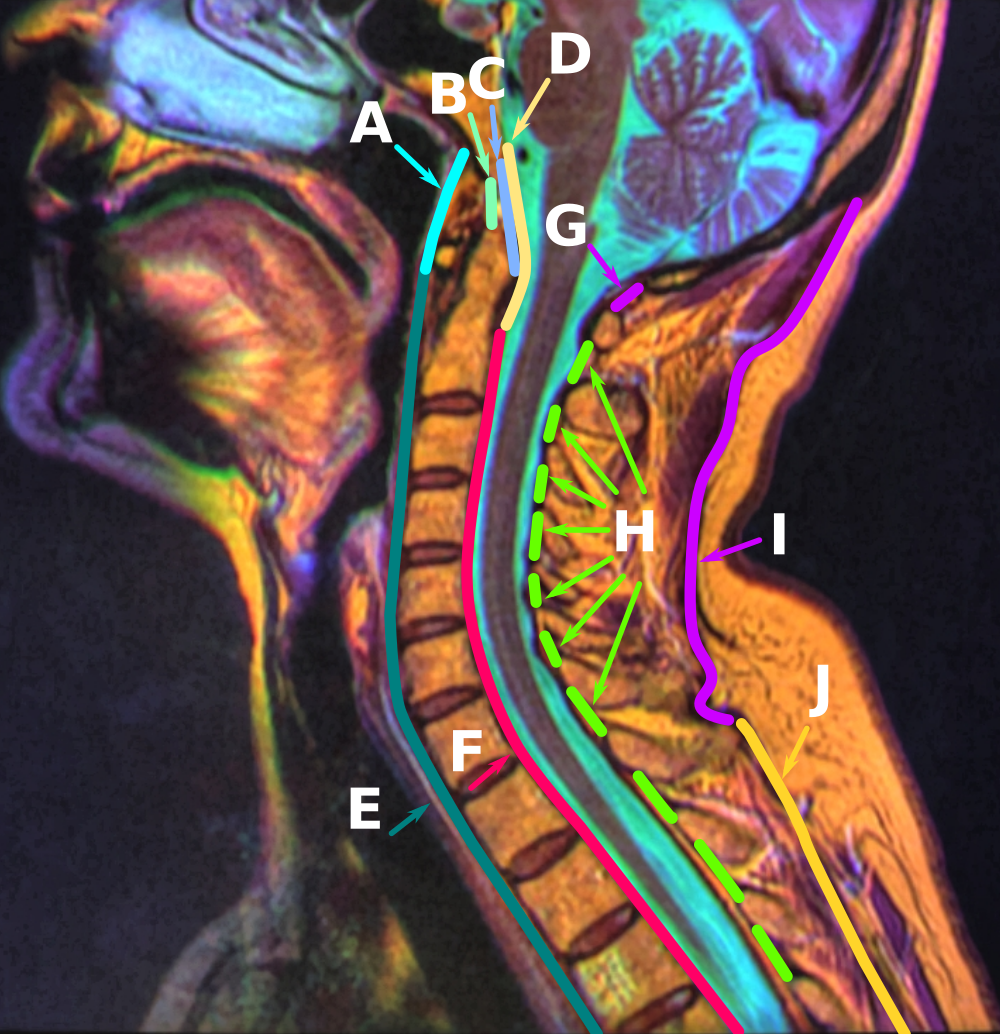
A: Anterior atlantooccipital membrane

Laterally, it is blends with either articular capsule.

This membrane is in relation in anteriorly with the rectus capitis anterior muscles, and posteriorly with the alar ligaments.

== See also ==
- Posterior atlantooccipital membrane
