= Arcuate foramen =

Anatomical variation in the neck

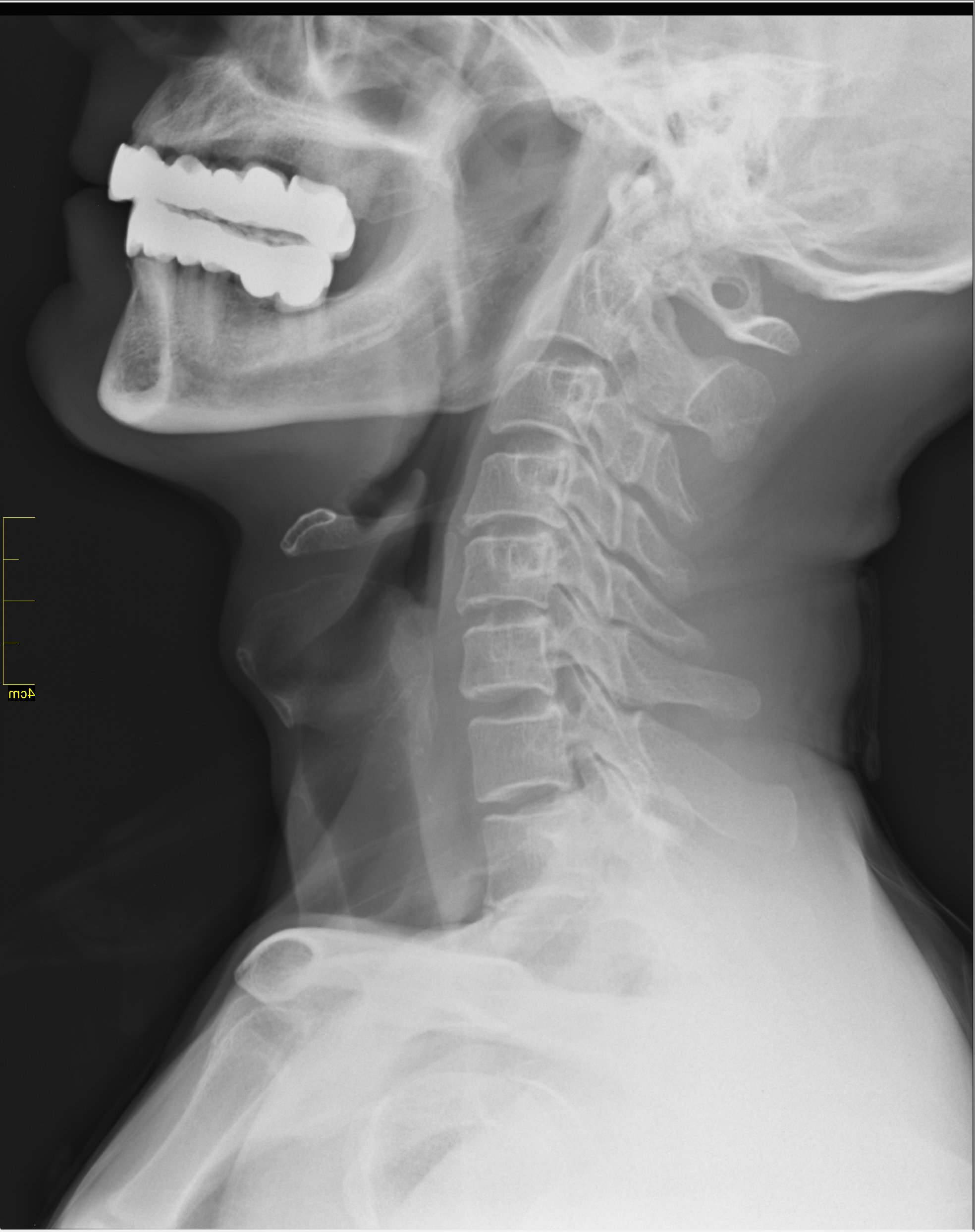
Arcuate foramen

In human anatomy, arcuate foramen, also known as ponticulus posticus (Latin for "little posterior bridge") or Kimmerle's anomaly, refers to a bony bridge on the atlas (C1 vertebra) that covers the groove for the vertebral artery. It is a common anatomical variation and estimated to occur in approximately 3-15% of the population. It occurs in females more commonly than males. The ponticulus posticus is created through ossification of the posterior atlantooccipital ligament.

== Pathology ==
The presence of arcuate foramen is associated with headache, musculoskeletal pain and vertebrobasilar stroke.
