= Transverse ligament of atlas =

Ligament of the spine

Transverse ligament of the atlas
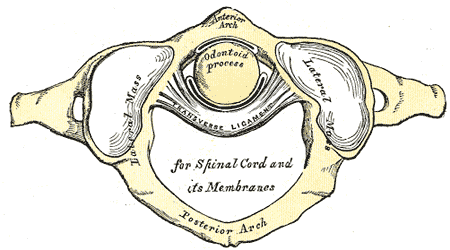
- Articulation between odontoid process and atlas. (Transverse ligament visible at center.)

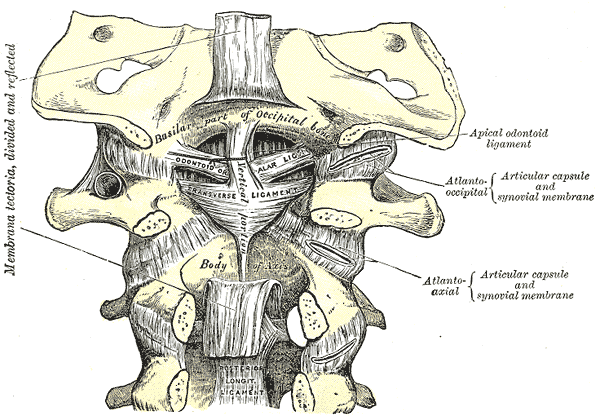
- Membrana tectoria, transverse, and alar ligaments. (Transverse ligament visible at center.)

Details

Identifiers
- Latin: ligamentum transversum atlantis
- TA98: A03.2.04.006
- TA2: 1703
- FMA: 24961

In anatomy, the transverse ligament of the atlas is a broad, tough ligament which arches across the ring of the atlas (first cervical vertebra) posterior to the dens to keep the dens (odontoid process) in contact with the atlas. It forms the transverse component of the cruciform ligament of atlas.

== Structure ==
The length of the ligament is variable; its mean length is 2 cm.

The ligament broadens and thickens medially. The anterior medial aspect of the ligament is lined by a thin layer of articular cartilage. The neck of the odontoid process is constricted where it is embraced posteriorly by the transverse ligament so it retains the dens in position even after all other ligaments have been sectioned.

=== Attachments ===
The ligament attaches on either side onto a small yet prominent tubercle upon the medial aspect of either lateral mass of atlas.

==== Cruciate ligament ====
A strong median band (crus superius) extends superiorly from the superior margin of the ligament to attach onto the basilar part of occipital bone (between the attachments of the apical ligament of dens, and tectorial membrane). A weaker and somewhat inconsistent median band (crus inferius) extends inferiorly from the ligament to attach onto the posterior aspect of the body of axis. The ligament and the two median bands together constitute the cruciate ligament of atlas.

=== Relations ===
The transverse ligament divides the vertebral foramen of the axis into an anterior portion (constituting one third of its lumen) which contains the dens, and a posterior portion (constituting two thirds of the foramen's lumen) which contains the spinal cord and its coverings as well as the two accessory nerves (CN XI).

== Clinical significance ==
Excessive laxity of the posterior transverse ligament can lead to atlantoaxial instability, a common complication in patients with Down Syndrome and Ehlers–Danlos syndrome. Laxity has also been hypothesized as the cause of degenerative hypertrophy and mechanical atlantoaxial stress. Degenerative processes can give rise to transverse ligament cysts, resulting in progressive cervical myelopathy. The treatment of choice for transverse ligament cysts with progressive neurological decline is surgical resection and cervical fusion. Conservative treatment with external neck immobilization is less commonly reported, but may be very useful in select cases where immediate surgical intervention is not indicated.

== See also ==
- Atlanto-axial joint
