= Alar ligament =

Ligament of the spine and skull

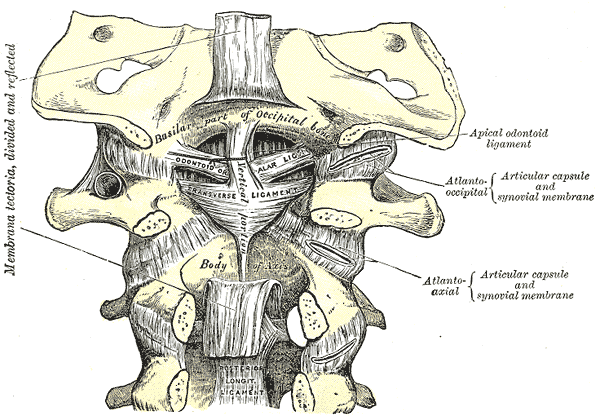
- Membrana tectoria, transverse, and alar ligaments. Alar ligament labeled at center right

Details
- From: Sides of the dens (on the axis, or the second cervical vertebra)
- To: Tubercles on the medial side of the occipital condyle

Identifiers
- Latin: ligamenta alaria
- TA98: A03.2.04.002
- TA2: 1695
- FMA: 71395

In anatomy, the alar ligaments are ligaments which connect the dens (a bony protrusion on the second cervical vertebra) to tubercles on the medial side of the occipital condyle.

They are short, tough, fibrous cords that attach on the skull and on the axis, and function to check side-to-side movements of the head when it is turned. Because of their function, the alar ligaments are also known as the "check ligaments of the odontoid".

== Structure ==
The alar ligaments are two strong, rounded cords of about 0.5 cm in diameter that run from the sides of the foramen magnum of the skull to the dens of the axis, the second cervical vertebra. They span almost horizontally, creating an angle between them of at least 140°.

=== Development ===
The alar ligaments, along with the transverse ligament of the atlas, derive from the axial component of the first cervical sclerotome.

== Function ==
The function of the alar ligaments is to limit the amount of rotation of the head, and by their action on the dens of the axis, they attach the skull to the axis, the second cervical vertebra.

== Clinical significance ==
The alar ligaments are prone to tearing if a force is applied when the head is flexed and in rotation. If an alar ligament is ruptured, the range of rotation of the head relative to the neck increases beyond the normal limit of 20 degrees.
