= Human back =

Body part

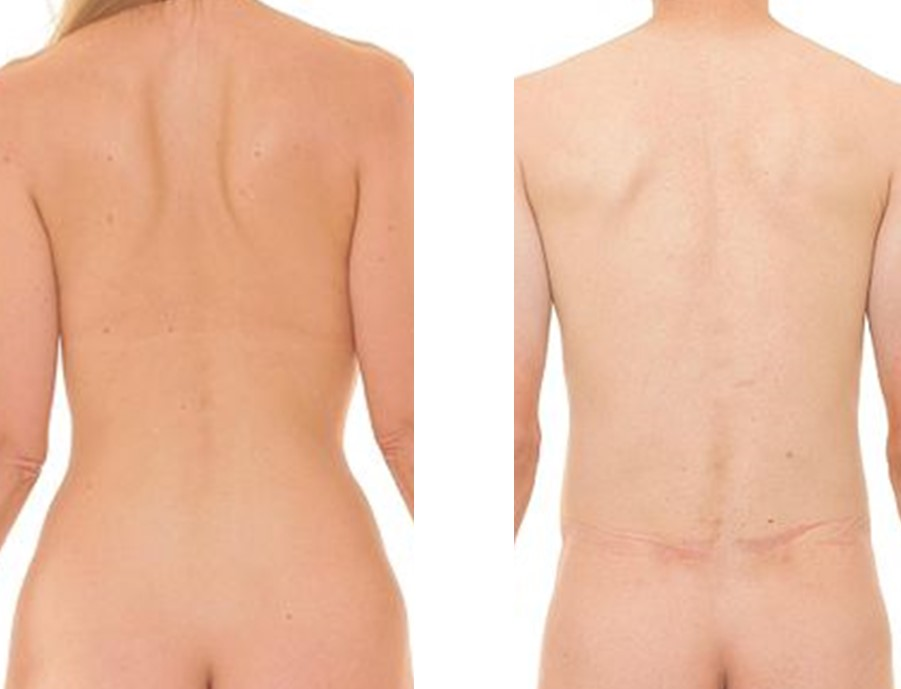
- Female human back (left), male human back (right)

Details

Identifiers
- Latin: dorsum
- MeSH: D001415
- TA98: A01.1.00.018; A01.2.05.001
- TA2: 135
- FMA: 14181

The human back, also called the dorsum (pl.: dorsa), is the large posterior area of the human body, rising from the top of the buttocks to the back of the neck. It is the surface of the body opposite from the chest and the abdomen. The vertebral column runs the length of the back and creates a central area of recession. The breadth of the back is created by the shoulders at the top and the pelvis at the bottom.

Back pain is a common medical condition, generally benign in origin.

== Structure ==
The central feature of the human back is the vertebral column, specifically the length from the top of the thoracic vertebrae to the bottom of the lumbar vertebrae, which houses the spinal cord in its spinal canal, and which generally has some curvature that gives shape to the back. The ribcage extends from the spine at the top of the back (with the top of the ribcage corresponding to the T1 vertebra), more than halfway down the length of the back, leaving an area with less protection between the bottom of the ribcage and the hips. The width of the back at the top is defined by the scapula, the broad, flat bones of the shoulders.

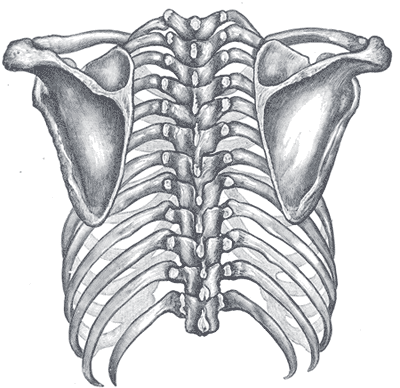
View of the bones of the thorax and shoulders from behind.

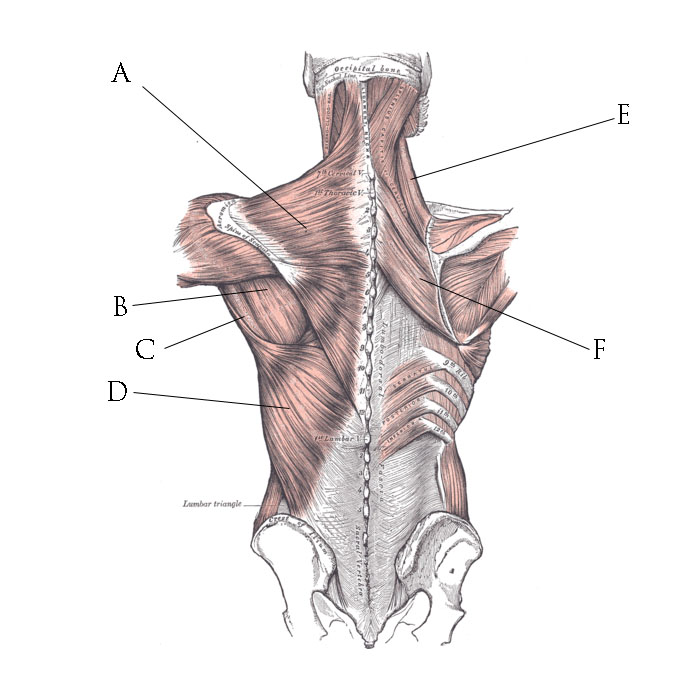
Posterior view of muscles connecting the upper extremity to the vertebral column.
A Trapezius
B Infraspinatus
C Teres major
D Latissimus dorsi
E Levator scapulae
F Rhomboid major

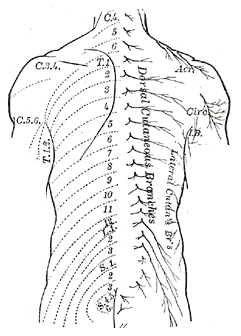
Distribution of cutaneous nerves, dorsal aspect. Dorsal and lateral cutaneous branches labeled at center right.

=== Muscles ===
The muscles of the human back

The muscles of the back can be divided into three distinct groups; a superficial group, an intermediate group and a deep group.

==== Superficial group ====
The superficial group, also known as the appendicular group, is primarily associated with movement of the appendicular skeleton. It is composed of trapezius, latissimus dorsi, rhomboid major, rhomboid minor and levator scapulae. It is innervated by anterior rami of spinal nerves, reflecting its embryological origin outside the back.

==== Intermediate group ====
The intermediate group is also known as respiratory group as it may serve a respiratory function. It is composed of serratus posterior superior and serratus posterior inferior. Like the superficial group, it is innervated by anterior rami of spinal nerves.

==== Deep group ====
The deep group, also known as the intrinsic group due to its embryological origin in the back, can be further subdivided into four groups:

- Spinotransversales – composed of splenius capitis and splenius cervicis.
- Erector spinae – composed of iliocostalis, longissismus and spinalis
- Transversospinales – composed of semispinalis, multifidus and rotatores
- Segmental muscles – composed of levatores costarum, interspinales and intertransversarii

The deep group is innervated by the posterior rami of spinal nerves.

=== Organs near the back ===
The lungs are within the ribcage, and extend to the back of the ribcage making it possible for them to be listened into through the back. The kidneys are situated beneath the muscles in the area below the end of the ribcage, loosely connected to the peritoneum. A strike to the lower back can damage the kidneys of the person being hit.

=== Surface of the back ===
The skin of the human back is thicker and has fewer nerve endings than the skin on any other part of the torso. With some notable exceptions (see, e.g., George "the Animal" Steele), it tends to have less hair than the chest on men. The upper-middle back is also the one area of the body which a typical human under normal conditions might be unable to physically touch.

The skin of the back is innervated by the dorsal cutaneous branches, as well as the lateral abdominal cutaneous branches of intercostal nerves.

=== Movement ===
The intricate anatomy of the back provides support for the head and trunk of the body, strength in the trunk of the body, as well as a great deal of flexibility and movement. The upper back has the most structural support, with the ribs attached firmly to each level of the thoracic spine and very limited movement. The lower back (lumbar vertebrae) allows for flexibility and movement in back bending (extension) and forward bending (flexion). It does not permit twisting.

== Clinical significance ==
=== Back pain ===
The back comprises interconnecting nerves, bones, muscles, ligaments, and tendons, all of which can be a source of pain. Back pain is the second most common type of pain in adults (the most common being headaches). By far the most common cause of back pain is muscle strain. The back muscles can usually heal themselves within a couple of weeks, but the pain can be intense and debilitating. Other common sources of back pain include disc problems, such as degenerative disc disease or a lumbar disc herniation, many types of fractures, such as spondylolisthesis or an osteoporotic fracture, or osteoarthritis.

== Society and culture ==
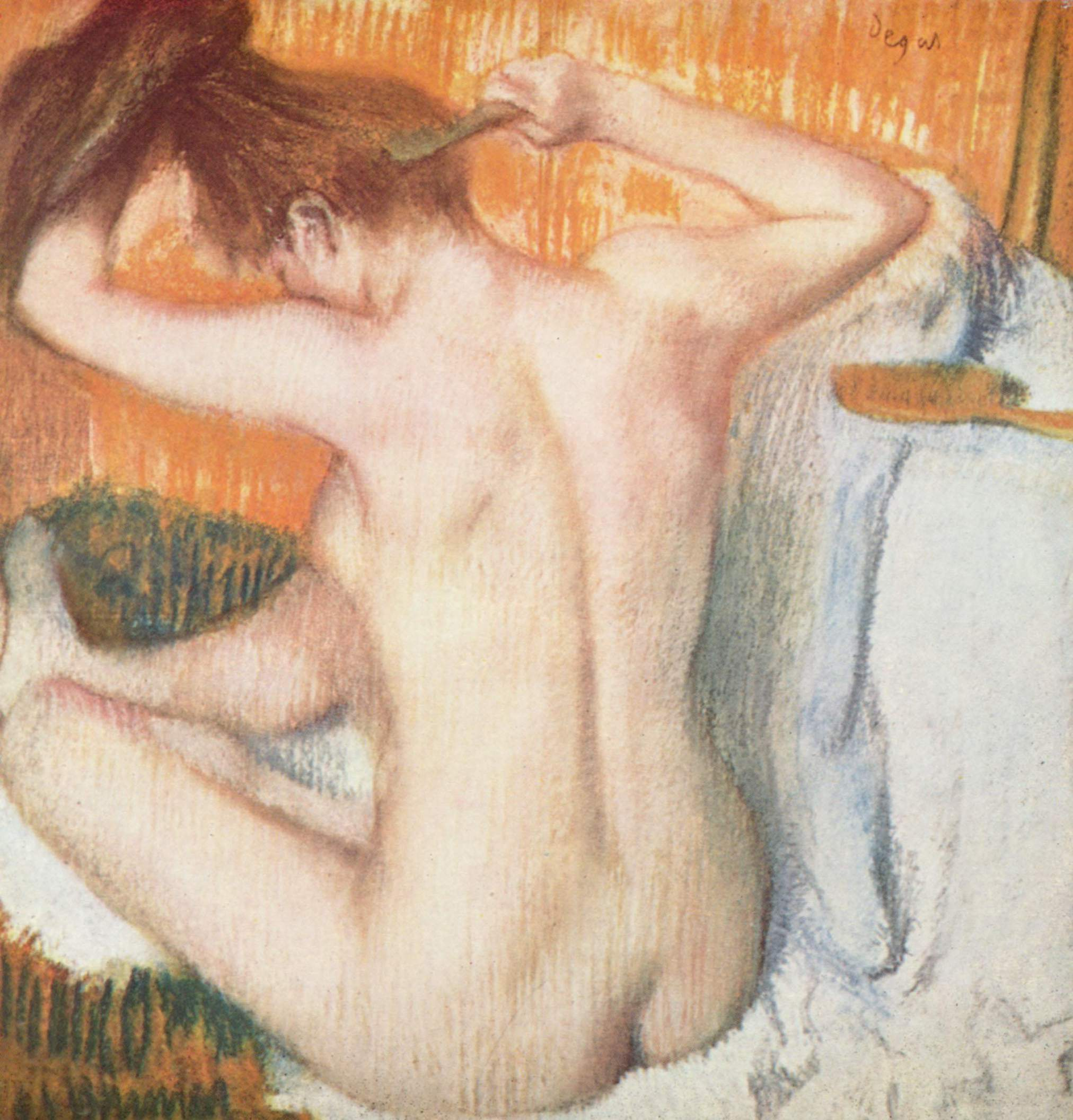
Painting of a woman's back by Edgar Degas

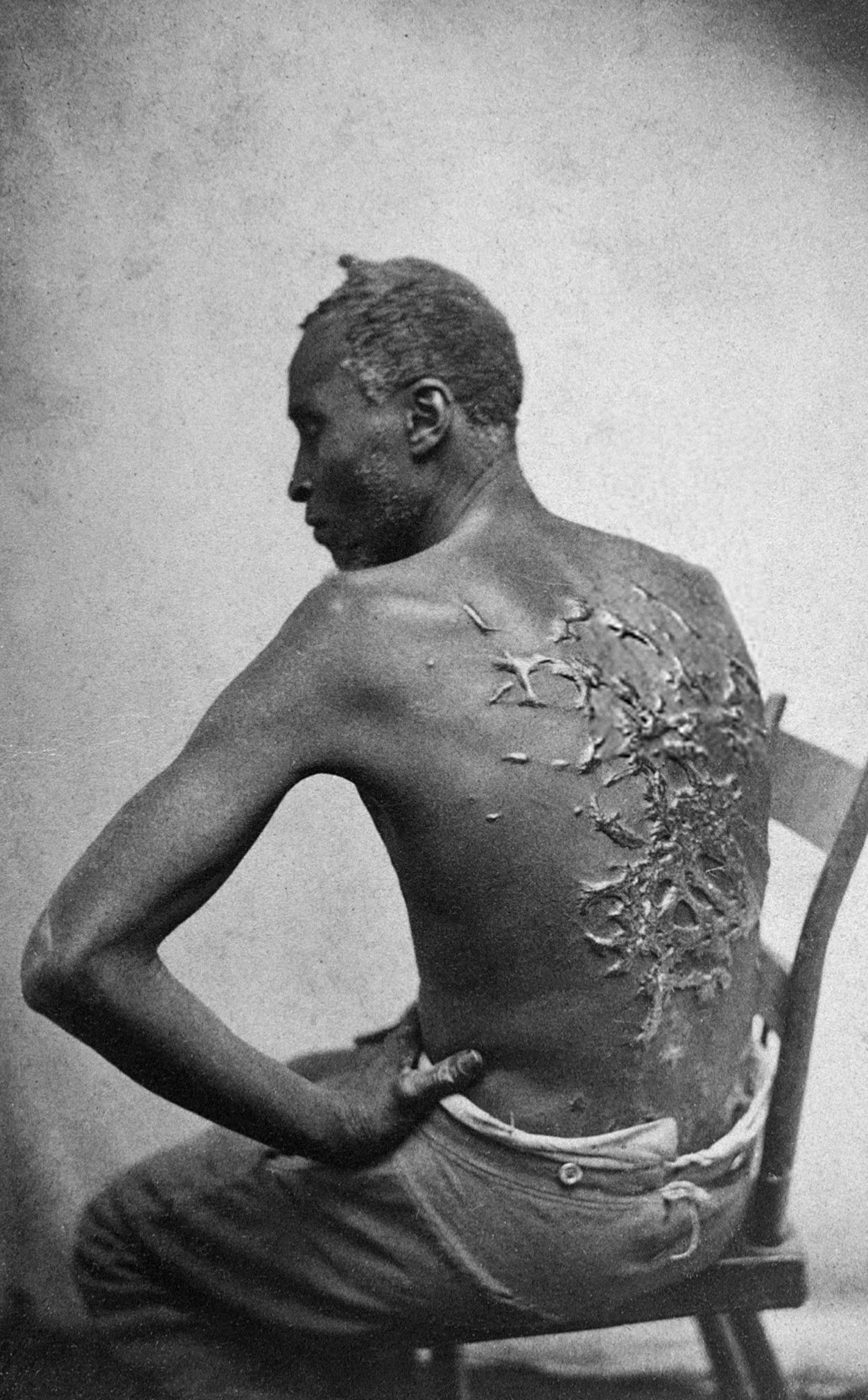
A substantial area of scar tissue on the back of Gordon, an enslaved person who was frequently whipped

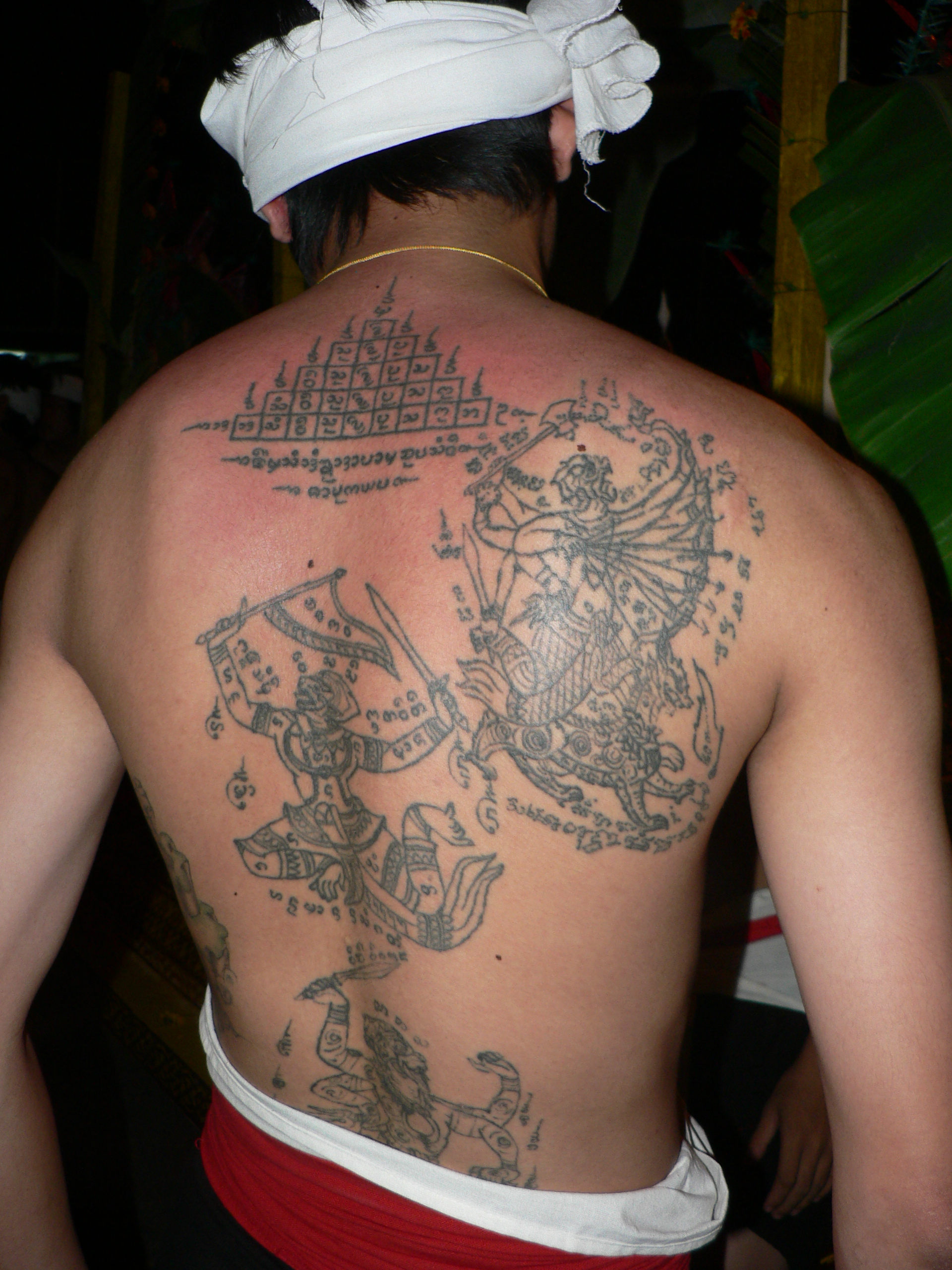
Extensive back tattoo

The curvature of the female back is a frequent theme in paintings, because the sensibilities of many cultures permit the back to be shown nude – implying full nudity without actually displaying it. Indeed, the practice of showing explicitness on the lower back has been performed for centuries. Certain articles of clothing, such as the haltertop and the backless dress, are designed to expose the back in this manner. The lower back is typically exposed frequently by many types of shirts in woman's fashion, and even the more conservative shirts and blouses will reveal the lower back. This happens for a variety of reasons – the lower waist area is a pivot point for the body and lengthens and arches as a person sits or bends. Secondly, woman's fashion typically favors tops that are waist length, allowing the back to be left bare during slight movement, bending or sitting. The back also serves as the largest canvas for body art on the human body. Because of its size and the relative lack of hair, the back presents an ideal canvas on the human body for lower back tattoos, mostly among young women. Indeed, some individuals have tattoos that cover the entirety of the back. Others have smaller tattoos at significant locations, such as the shoulder blade or the bottom of the back.

The part of the back that typically cannot be reached to be scratched is sometimes named acnestis. An itch there can be irritant, leading to the development and use of backscratchers.

Many English idioms mention the back, usually highlighting it as an area of vulnerability; one must "watch one's back", or one may end up "with one's back up against the wall"; worse yet, someone may "stab one in the back", but hopefully a friend "has got one's back". "Wetback" is a derogatory name in American English for immigrants who cross the US–Mexico border illegally (purportedly swimming though the Rio Grande). The back is also a symbol of strength and hard work, with those seeking physical labor looking for "strong backs", and workers being implored to "put their back into it".

Historically, flagellation of a person across the back with a whip was both a common form of punishment of criminals, and a common means of forcing slaves to work. As well, self-flagellation, as in self punishment, may include the use of whipping oneself. This is one method of mortification, the practice of inflicting physical suffering on oneself with the religious belief that it will serve as penance for one's own sins or those of others. While more moderate forms of mortification are widely practiced – particularly in the Catholic Church – self flagellation is not encouraged by mainstream religions or religious leaders. A well-known instrument used for flagellations is the infamous cat o' nine tails, a nine-corded whip with one handle enabling a much more effective whipping than would be possible with only one lashing at a time.
