= Core (anatomy) =

Anatomy term for the body minus the limbs

The core or trunk is the axial (central) part of an organism's body. In common parlance, the term is broadly considered to be synonymous with the torso, but academically it also includes the head and neck. Functional movements are highly dependent on this part of the body, and lack of core muscular development can result in a predisposition to injury. The major muscles of the core reside in the area of the belly and the mid- and lower back (not the shoulders), and peripherally include the hips, the shoulders and the neck.

== Muscles ==
Major muscles included are the pelvic floor muscles, transversus abdominis, multifidus, internal and external obliques, rectus abdominis, erector spinae (sacrospinalis) especially the longissimus thoracis, and the diaphragm. Some lumbar muscles (quadratus Lumborum (deep portion), and rotatores) and cervical muscles (rectus capitus anterior and lateralis and the longus colli) may also be considered members of the core group.

Minor core muscles include the latissimus dorsi, gluteus maximus, and trapezius.

== Functions of the core ==
The core is used to stabilize the thorax and the pelvis during dynamic movement and it also provides internal pressure to expel substances (vomit, feces, carbon-laden air, etc.).

- Continence

Continence is the ability to withhold bowel movements, and urinary stress incontinence (the lack of bladder control due to pelvic floor dysfunction) can result from weak core musculature.

- Pregnancy

Core muscles, specifically the transversus abdominis, are used during labor and delivery.

- Valsalva maneuver

Core muscles are also involved in the Valsalva maneuver, where the thorax tightens while the breath is held to assist, often involuntarily, in activities such as lifting, pushing, excretion and birthing.

=== Anatomical posture and support ===
The core is traditionally assumed to originate most full-body functional movement, including most sports. In addition, the core determines to a large part a person's posture. In all, the human anatomy is built to take force upon the bones and direct autonomic force, through various joints, in the desired direction. The core muscles align the spine, ribs, and pelvis of a person to resist a specific force, whether static or dynamic.

==== Static core function ====
Static core functionality is the ability of one's core to align the skeleton to resist a force that does not change.

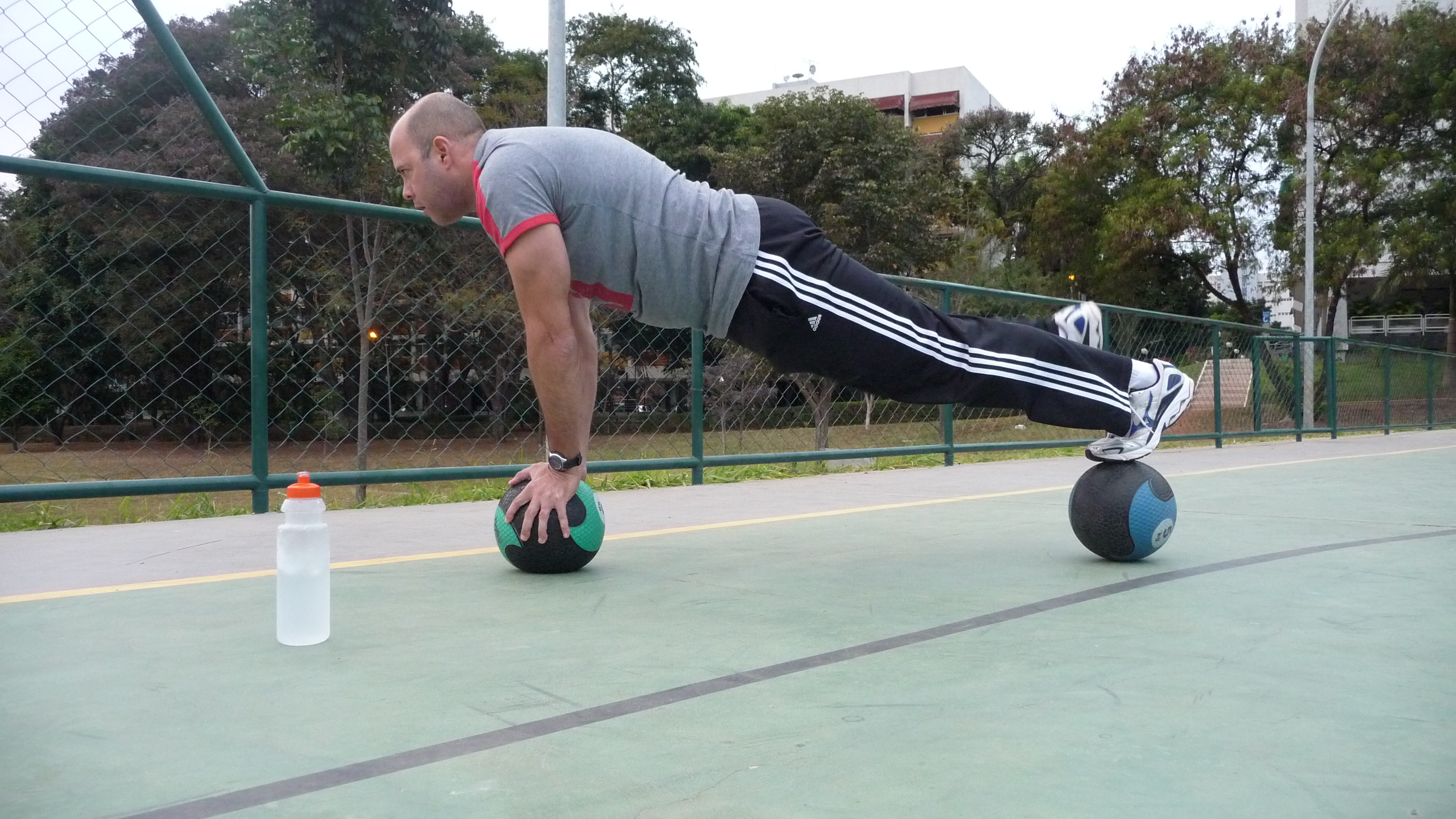
Medicine ball plank

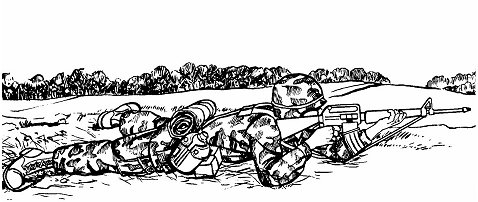
From Army FM 3-22.9 page 4-16

An example of static core function is firing a rifle in the prone position. To maintain accuracy, the shooter must be able to transfer their body weight and the weight of the rifle into the earth. Any attempt of the shooter to create a dynamic motion of the sights (muscle the sights onto the target vs. allowing the posture to aim) will result in a jerky posture where the sights do not sit still on the target. For the shooter to maintain accuracy, the muscles cannot exert force on the rifle, and the skeleton must be aligned to set the rifle (and therefore the sights) onto the target. The core, while resting on the ground and relatively far away from the rifle, is nevertheless aligning the spine and pelvis to which the shoulder and arms and neck are connected. For these peripheral elements to remain static, and not move unnecessarily, the spine, pelvis, and rib cage must be aligned towards this end. Thus the core muscles provide support of the axial skeleton (skull, spine, and tailbone) in an alignment where the upper body can provide a steady, solid base for the rifle to remain motionless.

- Resistance: Gravity
- Plane of movement: Coronal (side to side), Sagittal (forward and behind the anatomical position).

The main anatomical planes of the human body, including median (red), parasagittal (yellow), frontal or coronal plane (blue) and transverse or axial plane (green).

==== Dynamic core function ====
The nature of dynamic movement must take into account our skeletal structure (as a lever) in addition to the force of external resistance, and consequently incorporates a vastly different complex of muscles and joints versus a static position.

Because of this functional design, during dynamic movement there is more dependence on core musculature than just skeletal rigidity as in a static situation. This is because the purpose of the movement is not to resist a static, unchanging resistance, but to resist a force that changes its plane of motion. By incorporating movement, the bones of the body must absorb the resistance in a fluid manner, and thus tendons, ligaments, muscles, and innervation take on different responsibilities. These responsibilities include postural reactions to changes in speed (quickness of a contraction), motion (reaction time of a contraction), and power (amount of resistance resisted in a period of time).

An example of this is walking on a slope. The body must resist gravity while moving in a direction, and balancing itself on uneven ground. This forces the body to align the bones in a way that balances the body while at the same time achieving momentum through pushing against the ground in the opposite direction of the desired movement. Initially, it may seem that the legs are the prime movers of this action, but without balance, the legs will only cause the person to fall over. Therefore, the prime mover of walking is achieving core stability, and then the legs move this stable core by using the leg muscles.

== See also ==
- Axial skeleton
- PLAC Injury
