= In situ =

Latin phrase that translates literally to 'on site'

In situ (Note: UK: /ɪn ˈsɪtjuː/, /ɪn ˈsɪtʃuː/; US: /ˌɪn ˈsaɪtjuː/, /ˌɪn ˈsɪtjuː/; often not italicized in English) is a Latin phrase meaning 'in the place' or 'on site', derived from in ('in') and situ (ablative of situs, lit. 'place'). The term refers to studying or working with something in its natural or original location rather than moving it elsewhere. This approach preserves environmental factors and relationships that might be lost when materials or specimens are relocated to controlled settings. In comparison, ex situ ('out of the place') methods involve removing materials or specimens for study, preservation, or modification under controlled conditions, often at the expense of their original context. The earliest recorded use of in situ in English dates back to the mid-17th century. Its use in scientific literature expanded from the late 19th century onward, beginning in medicine and engineering, and later spreading to a wide range of disciplines.

The natural sciences typically use in situ methods to study phenomena in their original context. In geology, field studies of soil composition and rock formations may provide direct insights into Earth's processes. Biologists observe organisms in their natural habitats to understand behaviors and ecological interactions that cannot be reproduced in a laboratory. In chemistry and experimental physics, in situ techniques make it possible to watch substances and reactions as they occur, capturing transient phenomena in real time.

The scope of in situ methods extends into applied sciences and the humanities. In aerospace engineering, in situ inspections and monitoring systems evaluate performance without interrupting operations. Environmental scientists use ecosystem monitoring in the field to gather reliable data with minimal disturbance. In medicine, especially oncology, carcinoma in situ describes early-stage cancers that remain localized at their site of origin. Space exploration relies on in situ methods to conduct direct observational studies and data collection on celestial bodies, avoiding the challenges of sample-return missions. In archaeology, in situ generally refers to artifacts and features found in undisturbed depositional settings, where recording spatial and stratigraphic relationships preserves information about past human activities. In art, in situ refers to works created or displayed in dialogue with their surroundings: site-specific projects, such as environmental sculptures or architectural installations, are conceived for particular locations.

== History ==
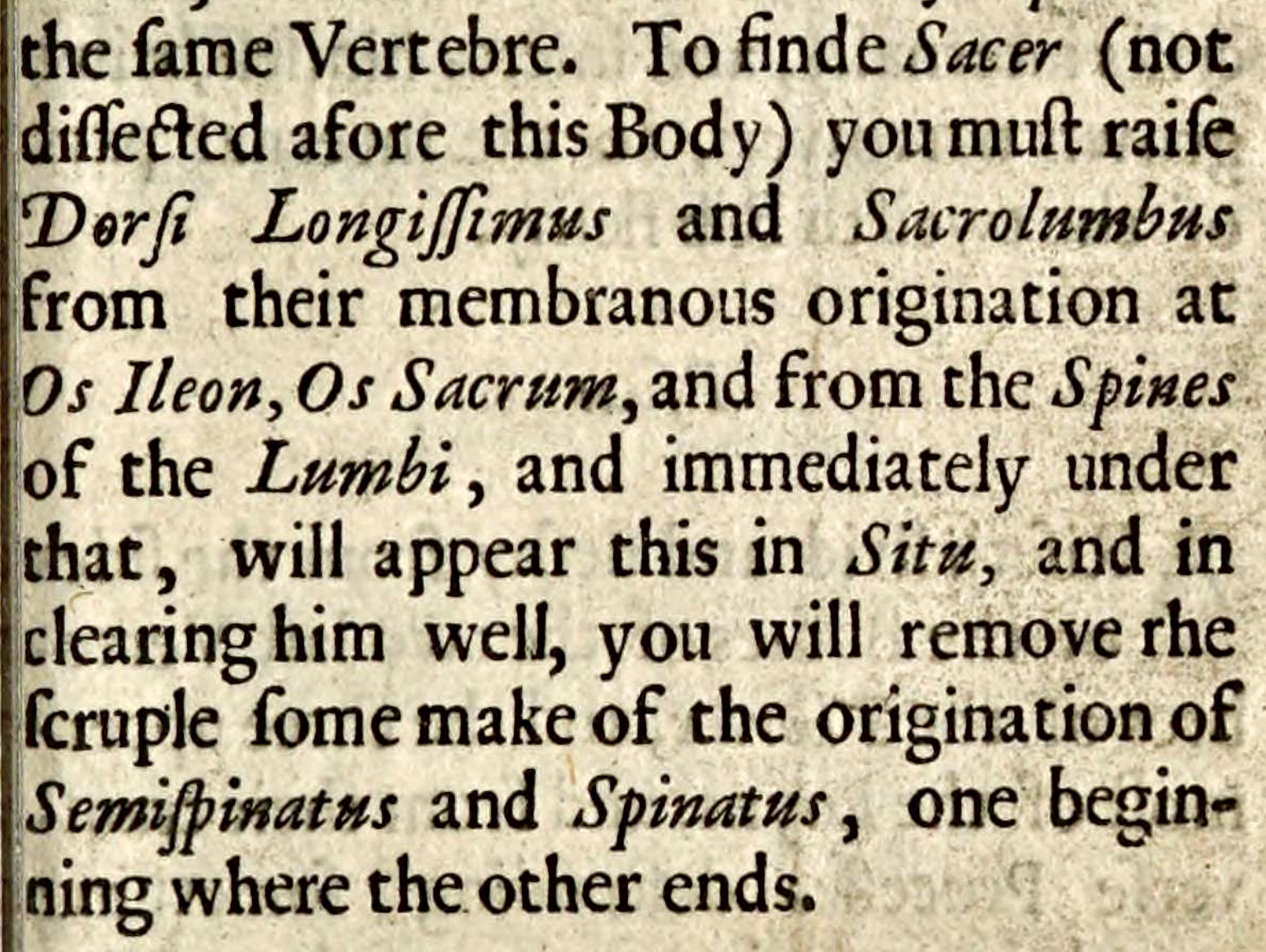
William Molins' Myskotomia (1648), showing the term in situ in an anatomical context. (Note: Diplomatic transcription (original spelling) of the passage: […] To finde Sacer (not dissected afore this Body) you must raise Dorsi Longissimus and Sacrolumbus from their membranous origination at Os Ileon, Os Sacrum, and from the Spines of the Lumbi, and immediately under that, will appear this in Situ, and in clearing him well, you will remove the scruple some make of the origination of Semispinatus and Spinatus, one beginning where the other ends. — Myskotomia (1648), page 63) The Oxford English Dictionary cites this as the earliest known use of the phrase in English.

The term in situ does not appear in Classical Latin. Its earliest recorded use is in Late Latin, with the first known instance in the writings of Augustine of Hippo (354–430 AD). (Note: An example of Augustine's use of the expression appears in Contra secundam Iuliani responsionem imperfectum opus ('Unfinished Work Against Julian's Second Reply'), Liber Quintus ('Book Five'): Utque ad causam referatur exemplum; naturae humanae generalitas institutionum infra se locatarum genus quoddam est; haec velut species habet, in situ, in membris, in ordinibus, in motibus, vel aliis id genus.) It became widely used in Medieval Latin. In English, the earliest known usage dates to the mid-17th century; the Oxford English Dictionary cites the first appearance in 1648, in William Molins' anatomical text Myskotomia. The usages in scientific literature increased from the late 19th century onward, initially in medicine and engineering, including geological surveys and petroleum extraction. During this period, the term described analyses conducted within the living human body or inside oil wells, among other applications. In situ entered French medical discourse by 1877 in the Journal de médecine et de chirurgie pratiques ('Journal of Practical Medicine and Surgery'). The compound term carcinoma in situ, referring to abnormal cells that are confined to their original location without invasion of surrounding tissue, was first used in a 1932 paper by U.S. surgical pathologist Albert C. Broders.

The concept of in situ in contemporary art developed in the late 1960s and 1970s as a framework for artworks created specifically for a given space. By the mid-1980s, the term was adopted in materials science, particularly in the field of heterogeneous catalysis, where a catalyst in one phase facilitates a chemical reaction in a different phase. Its usage later expanded beyond catalysis and is now applied across various disciplines within materials science. As of August 2022, the term in situ had been used in more than 910,000 scientific publications since 1874, while ex situ had appeared in over 29,000 scientific publications since 1958.

== Applications ==
=== Natural sciences ===
==== Astronomy ====
In astronomy, in situ measurement involves collecting data directly at or near a celestial object using spacecraft or instruments physically present at the location. For example, the Parker Solar Probe conducts in situ studies of the Sun's atmosphere, while the Cassini–Huygens mission similarly analyzed Saturn's magnetosphere. In situ formation refers to astronomical objects that formed at their current locations without significant migration. Some theories propose that planets, such as Earth, formed in their present orbits rather than moving from elsewhere. Star clusters may form within their host galaxy, rather than being accreted from external sources.

==== Biology ====
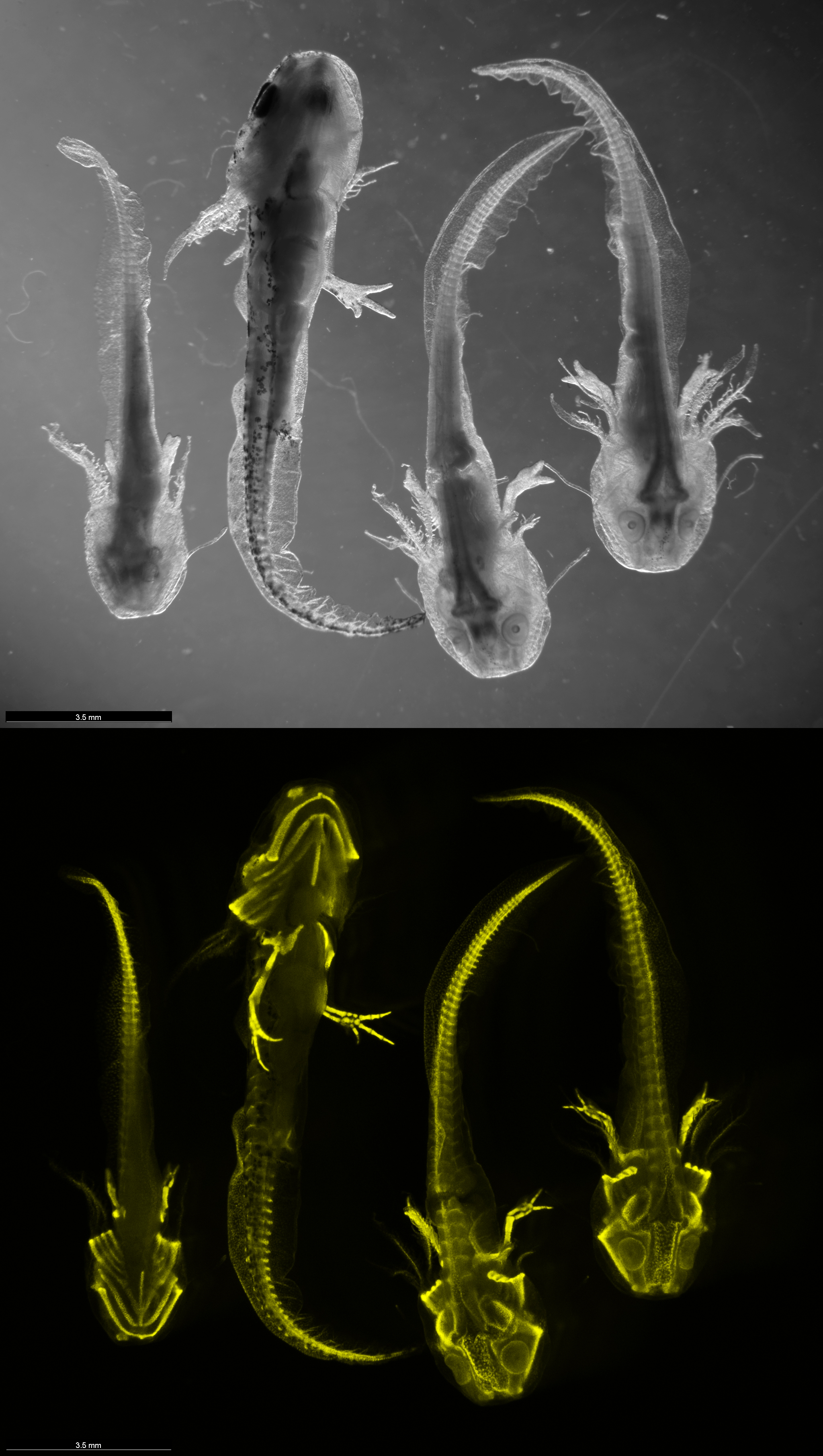
Gene expression of collagen in Iberian ribbed newt, via Hybridization Chain Reaction RNA Fluorescence In Situ Hybridization

In cell biology, in situ techniques allow the examination of cells or tissues within their native environment, preserving their natural structure and context. These approaches contrast with techniques requiring the extraction or isolation of cellular components. One example is in situ hybridization (ISH), a technique designed to identify and localize specific nucleic acid sequences within intact cells or tissue sections. ISH employs labeled probes, which are strands of nucleic acids engineered to bind selectively to target sequences. These probes are tagged with detectable markers, such as fluorophores or radioactive isotopes, enabling visualization of the precise spatial distribution of the targeted DNA or RNA. By maintaining the structural integrity of the sample, the technique facilitates mapping of genetic material within its original cellular or tissue framework.

In biological field research, the term in situ refers to the study of living organisms within their natural habitat. This includes collecting biological samples, conducting experiments, measuring abiotic factors, and documenting ecological or behavioral observations without relocating the subject.

==== Chemistry ====
In organic chemistry, in situ refers to processes that take place within the reaction mixture without isolating intermediates. In one-pot synthetic sequences, for example, in situ work-up modifications allow multiple reaction steps to proceed within a single vessel, reducing personnel exposure to unstable or hazardous substances (such as azide intermediates (Note: Sodium azide and its conjugate acid—hydrazoic acid—are both referred to as azide. Azides are explosophores and respiratory poisons.)), which may pose safety risks if isolated. Another example is the Corey–Chaykovsky reagent, a sulfur ylide generated in situ by deprotonating sulfonium halides with a strong base. This approach is used because unstabilized sulfur ylides are highly reactive; if isolated, they may decompose or lose reactivity. Consequently, their direct generation and use within the reaction mixture is more practical.

Analytical techniques such as nuclear magnetic resonance (NMR) spectroscopy, Raman spectroscopy, and mass spectrometry facilitate real-time monitoring of in situ reactions. These methods detect short-lived substances that form during a reaction, such as intermediates that might not be stable enough to isolate, and adjust conditions to improve the process; all without disturbing the reaction itself.

In electrochemistry, in situ experiments are performed under the normal operating conditions of an electrochemical cell, with the electrode maintained at a controlled potential (typically by a potentiostat). By contrast, ex situ experiments occur outside those operating conditions, usually without potential control; for example, after the electrode has been removed from the cell or left at open-circuit. Maintaining potential control in in situ measurements preserves the electrochemical environment at the electrode–electrolyte interface, thereby keeping the double layer and ongoing electron-transfer reactions intact at a given electrode potential.

=== Applied sciences ===
==== Aerospace engineering ====
In aerospace structural health monitoring, in situ inspection involves diagnostic techniques that assess components within their operational environments, avoiding the need for disassembly or service interruptions. The nondestructive testing (NDT) methods commonly used for in situ damage detection include infrared thermography, which measures thermal emissions to identify structural anomalies but is less effective on low-emissivity materials; speckle shearing interferometry (shearography), which analyzes surface deformation patterns but requires carefully controlled environmental conditions; and ultrasonic testing, which uses sound waves to detect internal defects in composite materials but can be time-intensive for large structures. Despite these individual limitations, the integration of these complementary techniques yields higher overall diagnostic accuracy. Another approach involves real-time monitoring using alternating current (AC) and direct current (DC) sensor arrays. These systems detect structural degradation, including matrix discontinuities, interlaminar delaminations, and fiber fractures, by analyzing variations in electrical resistance and capacitance within composite laminate structures.

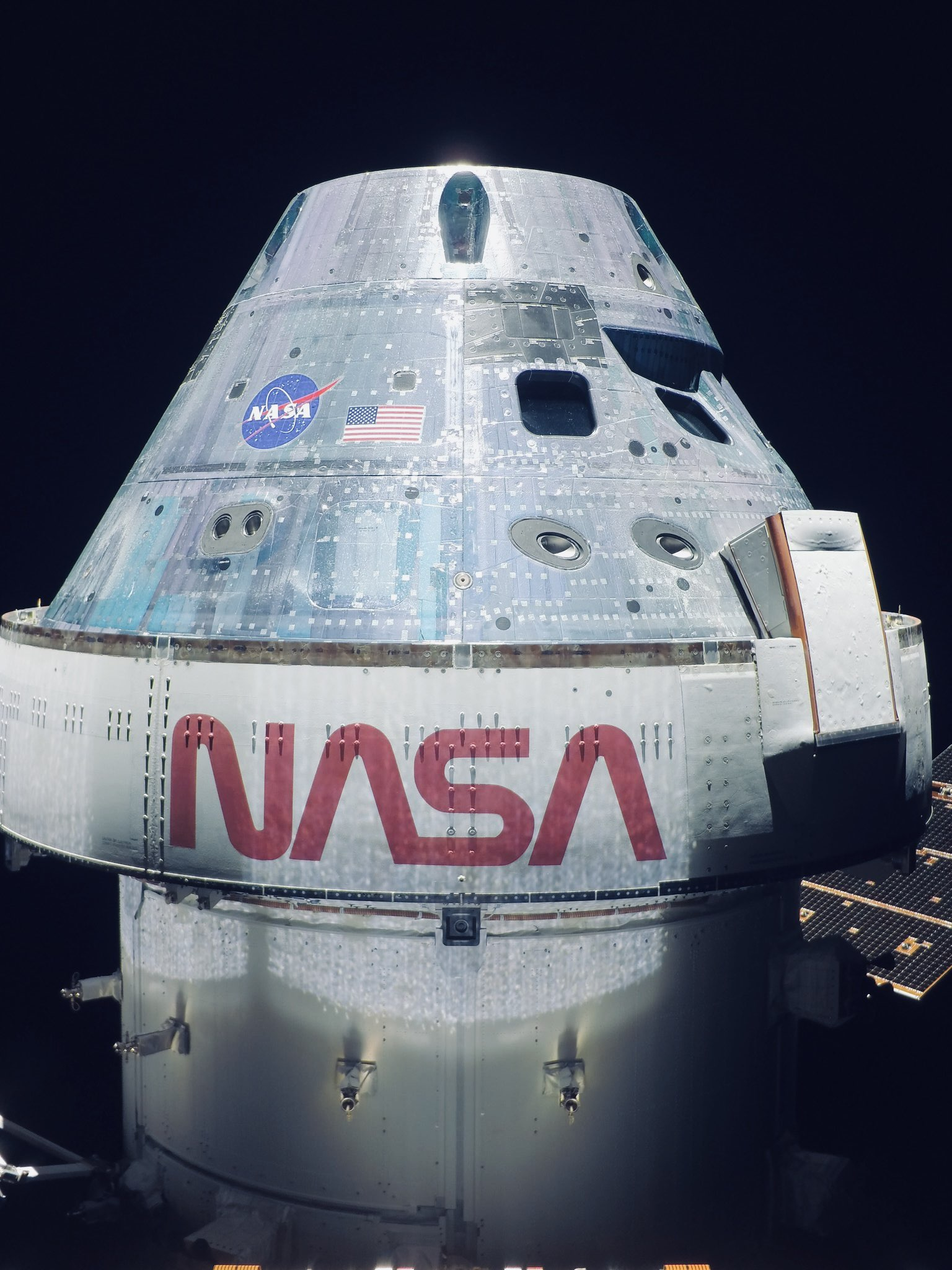
Photo of Orion taken during the flight of Artemis I

Future space exploration and terraforming efforts may depend on in situ resource utilization, reducing reliance on Earth-based supplies. Proposed missions, such as Orion and Mars Direct, have explored this approach by leveraging locally available materials. The Orion space vehicle was once considered for propulsion using fuel extracted from the Moon, while Mars Direct relies on the Sabatier reaction to synthesize methane and water from atmospheric carbon dioxide and hydrogen on Mars.

==== Biological and biomedical engineering ====
In biological engineering, in situ describes experimental treatments applied to cells or tissues while they remain intact, rather than using extracts. It also refers to assays or manipulations performed on whole tissues without disrupting their natural structure.

In biomedical engineering, in situ polymerization is used to produce protein nanogels, which serve as a versatile platform for the storage and release of therapeutic proteins. This approach has applications in cancer treatment, vaccination, diagnostics, regenerative medicine, and therapies for loss-of-function genetic diseases.

==== Civil engineering ====
In construction engineering, in situ construction refers to building work carried out directly on-site using raw materials, as opposed to prefabrication, where components are manufactured off-site and assembled on-site. In situ concrete is poured at its final location, offering structural stability compared to precast construction. In wall construction, reinforcing bars are assembled first, followed by the installation of formwork to contain the poured concrete. Once the concrete has cured, the formwork is removed, leaving the wall in place. Prefabrication, in contrast, reduces on-site labor requirements and shortens project timelines, but requires precise pre-planning and involves higher manufacturing and transportation costs.

In geotechnical engineering, the term in situ describes soil in its natural, undisturbed state, as opposed to fill material, which has been excavated and relocated. The differences between undisturbed soil and fill material affect how well a site can support structures, install underground utilities, and manage water drainage. Proper assessment of soil conditions is necessary to prevent issues such as uneven settling, unstable foundations, and poor water infiltration.

==== Computer science ====
In computer science, in situ refers to the use of technology and user interfaces to provide continuous access to situationally relevant information across different locations and contexts. Examples include athletes viewing biometric data on smartwatches to improve their performance or a presenter looking at tips on a smart glass to reduce their speaking rate during a speech.

An algorithm is said to be an in situ algorithm, or in-place algorithm, if the extra amount of memory required to execute the algorithm is O(1). With big data, in situ data would mean bringing the computation to where data is located, rather than the other way like in traditional RDBMS systems where data is moved to computational space.

==== Earth sciences ====
In Earth sciences, particularly in geomorphology, in situ refers to natural materials or processes occurring at their point of origin without being transported. An example is weathering, in which rocks undergo physical or chemical disintegration in place, in contrast to erosion, which involves the removal and relocation of materials by agents such as wind, water, or ice. Soil formed from the weathering of underlying bedrock is an example of an in situ formation. In situ measurements, such as those of soil moisture, rock stress, groundwater trends, or radiation levels, are conducted on-site to provide direct data. These measurements are often essential for validating remote sensing data, such as satellite imagery, which is widely used for large-scale environmental monitoring but may require in situ confirmation to ensure accuracy.

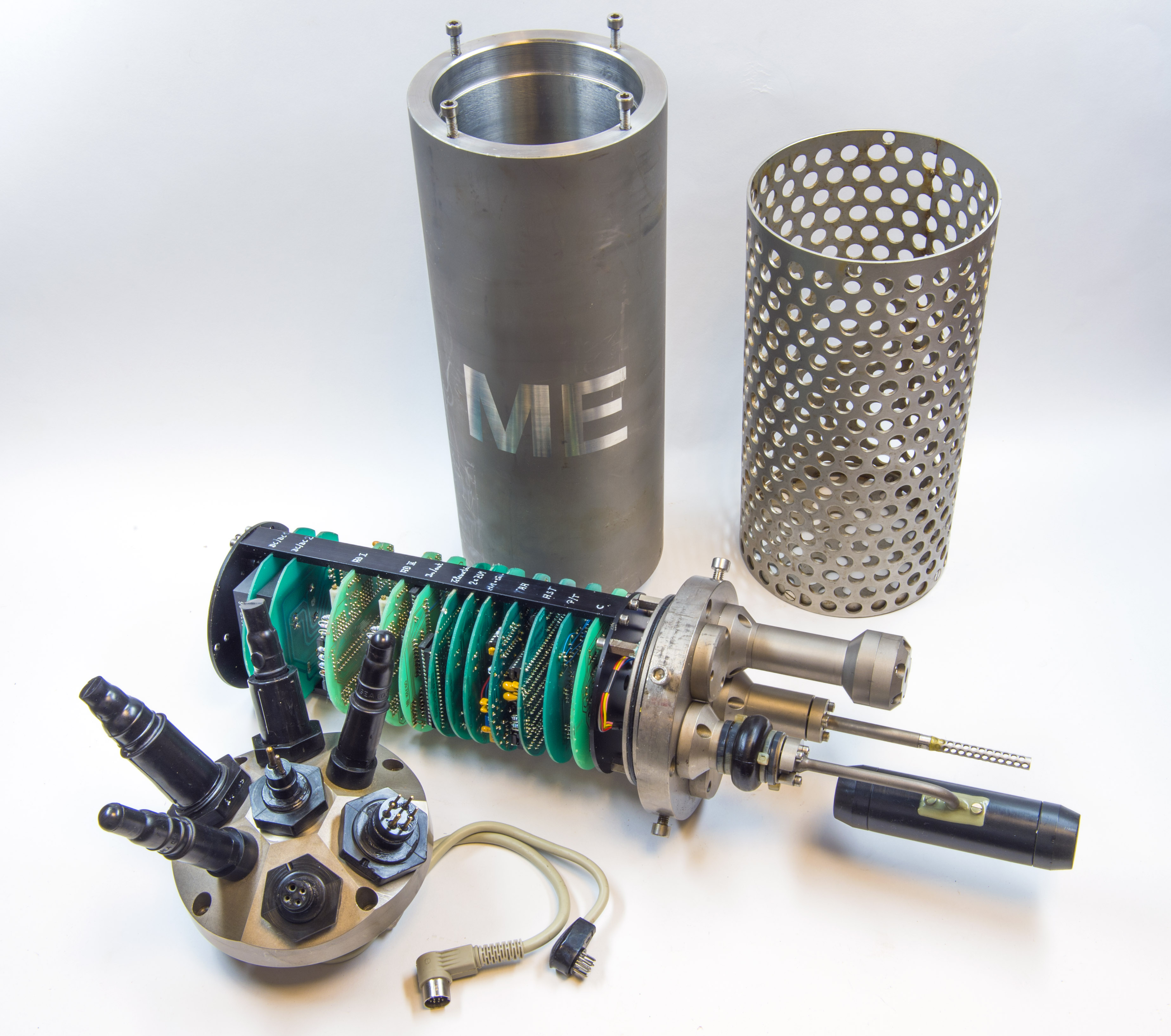
Disassembled CTD device, showing pressure housing, sensor cage, connectors, and internal electronics with sensors for conductivity, temperature, and pressure

In oceanography, in situ observational methods involve direct measurements of oceanic conditions, typically conducted during shipboard surveys. These methods employ specialized instruments, such as the Conductivity, Temperature, and Depth (CTD) device, which records parameters such as salinity, temperature, pressure, and biogeochemical properties like oxygen saturation. Historically, oceanographers used reversing thermometers, which were inverted at specific depths to trap mercury and preserve temperature readings for subsequent analysis. These instruments have been largely replaced by CTD devices and expendable bathythermographs.

In atmospheric sciences, in situ measurements refer to observations of atmospheric properties obtained using instruments placed within the environment being studied. Aircraft, balloons, and rockets are used to carry some of these instruments, allowing for direct interaction with the air to collect data. For example, radiosondes, carried aloft by weather balloons, measure atmospheric parameters such as temperature, humidity, and pressure as they ascend through the atmosphere, while anemometers, typically positioned at ground level or on towers, record wind speed and direction at specific locations. In contrast, remote sensing techniques, such as weather radar and satellite observations, collect atmospheric data from a distance by using electromagnetic radiation to infer properties without direct contact with the atmosphere.

==== Materials science ====
By the mid-1980s, the term in situ was adopted in materials science, particularly in the field of heterogeneous catalysis, where a catalyst in one phase facilitates a chemical reaction in a different phase. The term later expanded beyond catalysis and is now applied across various disciplines of materials science, alongside the opposite designation ex situ. For example, in situ describes the study of a sample maintained in a steady state (Note: In sample characterization terminology, a system is in a steady state condition when one or more of its characteristics remain constant over time. This condition does not necessarily correspond to thermodynamic equilibrium.) condition within a controlled environment, where specific parameters such as temperature or pressure are regulated. This approach allows researchers to observe materials under conditions that replicate their functional states. Examples include a sample held at a fixed temperature inside a cryostat, an electrode material operating within an electric battery, or a specimen enclosed within a sealed container to protect it from external influences.

In transmission electron microscopy (TEM) and scanning transmission electron microscopy (STEM), in situ refers to the observation of materials as they are exposed to external stimuli within the microscope, under conditions that mimic their natural environments. This enables real-time observation of material behavior at the nanoscale. External stimuli in in situ TEM/STEM experiments may include mechanical loading, pressure, temperature variation, electrical biasing, radiation, and environmental exposure to gases, liquids, or magnetic fields, individually or in combination. These conditions allow researchers to study atomic-level processes, such as phase transformations, chemical reactions, and mechanical deformations.

==== Medicine ====
In medical terminology, in situ belongs to a group of two-word Latin expressions, including in vitro ('within the glass', e.g., laboratory experiments), in vivo ('within the living', e.g., experiments on living organisms), and ex vivo ('out of the living', e.g., experiments on extracted tissues). These expressions facilitate concise communication of experimental and clinical contexts, much like abbreviations. In situ is widely used in medicine to describe phenomena or processes occurring in their original location. Its applications span oncology, measurement acquisition, medical simulation, and anatomical examination. Because of its versatility across such varied uses, one study has described in situ as among the most productive Latin expressions in contemporary medical discourse.

Diagram of an in situ carcinoma, not having invaded beyond the basement membrane

In oncology, in situ is applied in the context of carcinoma in situ (CIS), a term describing abnormal cells confined to their original location without invasion of surrounding tissue. The earliest known use of the term dates back to 1932 in the writing of U.S. surgical pathologist Albert C. Broders, who introduced both the term and the concept. The concept of CIS was initially controversial. CIS is a critical term in early cancer diagnosis, as it signifies a non-invasive stage, allowing for more targeted interventions such as localized excision or monitoring—before potential progression to invasive cancer. Melanoma in situ is an early, localized form of melanoma (a type of malignant skin cancer). In this stage, the cancerous melanocytes (the pigment-producing cells that give skin its color) are confined to the epidermis, the outermost layer of the skin; the melanoma has not yet penetrated into the deeper dermal layers or metastasized to other parts of the body.

Beyond oncology, in situ is used in fields where maintaining natural anatomical or physiological positions is essential. In orthopedic surgery, the term refers to procedures that preserve the natural alignment or position of bones or joints. For example, orthopedic plates or screws may be placed without altering the bone's original structure, as in "[the patient] was treated operatively with an in situ cannulated hip screw fixation". In cardiothoracic surgery, in situ often describes techniques where blood vessels are utilized in their original anatomical position for surgical purposes. For example, the internal thoracic artery can be left attached to the subclavian artery while rerouting blood flow to bypass occluded coronary arteries and improve heart circulation. In organ transplantation, in situ is used to describe procedures performed within the donor's body to preserve organ viability. In situ perfusion is a technique employed during organ retrieval to restore blood flow to organs while they remain in their original location. This method minimizes ischemic injury and preserves organ viability for transplantation. In contrast, ex situ machine perfusion involves perfusing the organ outside the donor's body, typically after it has been removed. (Note: See ex vivo.)

==== Petroleum engineering ====
In petroleum engineering, in situ techniques involve the application of heat or solvents to extract heavy crude oil or bitumen from reservoirs located beneath the Earth's surface. Several in situ methods exist, but those that utilize heat, particularly steam, have proven to be the most effective for oil sands extraction. The most widely used in situ technique is steam-assisted gravity drainage (SAGD). This method employs two horizontal wells: the upper well injects steam to heat the bitumen, reducing its viscosity, while the lower well collects the mobilized oil for extraction. SAGD has gained prominence in the Canadian province of Alberta, due to its efficiency in recovering bitumen from deep reservoirs. Approximately 80% of Alberta's oil sands deposits are located at depths that render open-pit mining impractical, making in situ techniques such as SAGD the primary method of extraction.

==== Urban planning ====
In urban planning, in situ upgrading is an approach to and method of upgrading informal settlements.

=== Humanities ===
==== Archaeology ====
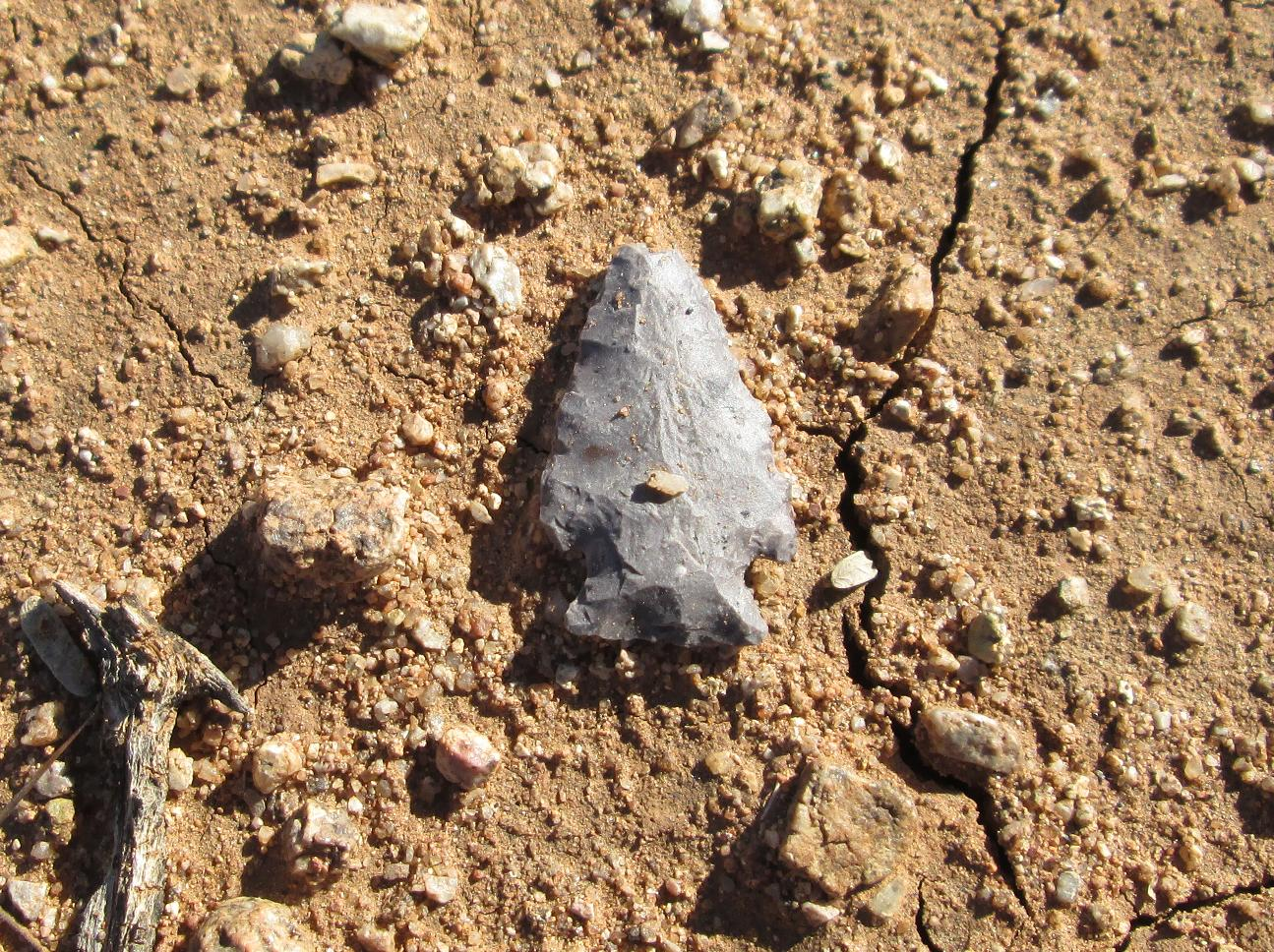
A Hohokam arrowhead in situ

In archaeology, the term in situ has been used variably to describe artifacts or features found undisturbed since deposition; however, its definition remains contested. Scholars distinguish between a broad usage, referring to materials recovered through controlled excavation, and a stricter usage applied only to those discovered in undisturbed depositional settings. Between these poles lies a continuum of depositional scenarios, from sealed habitation floors to slope or fluvial deposits, meaning that whether an object is in situ depends on site-specific formation processes and the degree to which stratigraphic—as well as spatial—relationships can be reconstructed. Recording the exact spatial coordinates, stratigraphic position, and surrounding matrix of depositional materials is necessary for understanding past human activities and historical processes. While artifacts are often removed for analysis, certain archaeological features—such as hearths, postholes, and architectural foundations—have to be thoroughly documented in place to preserve their contextual information during excavation. This documentation relies on various methods, including detailed field notes, scaled technical drawings, cartographic representation, and high-resolution photographic records. Current archaeological practice incorporates advanced digital technologies, including 3D laser scanning, photogrammetry, unmanned aerial vehicles, and Geographic Information Systems (GIS), to capture complex spatial relationships. Artifacts found outside their original context (ex situ), often due to natural disturbances or amateur excavations, have less interpretive value, but may provide clues about the spatial distribution and typological characteristics of unexcavated in situ deposits, guiding future excavation efforts.

The Convention on the Protection of the Underwater Cultural Heritage sets mandatory guidelines for signatory states regarding the treatment of underwater shipwrecks. One of its main principles is that in situ preservation is the preferred approach. This policy is based on the unique conditions of underwater environments, where low oxygen levels and stable temperatures help preserve artifacts over long periods. Removing artifacts from these conditions and exposing them to the atmosphere often accelerates deterioration, particularly the oxidation of iron-based materials.

In mortuary archaeology, in situ documentation involves systematically recording and cataloging human remains in their original depositional positions. These remains are often embedded in complex matrices of sediment, clothing, and associated artifacts. Excavating mass graves presents additional challenges, as they may contain hundreds of individuals. Before identifying individuals or determining causes of death, archaeologists must carefully document spatial relationships and contextual details to preserve forensic and historical information.

==== Art ====
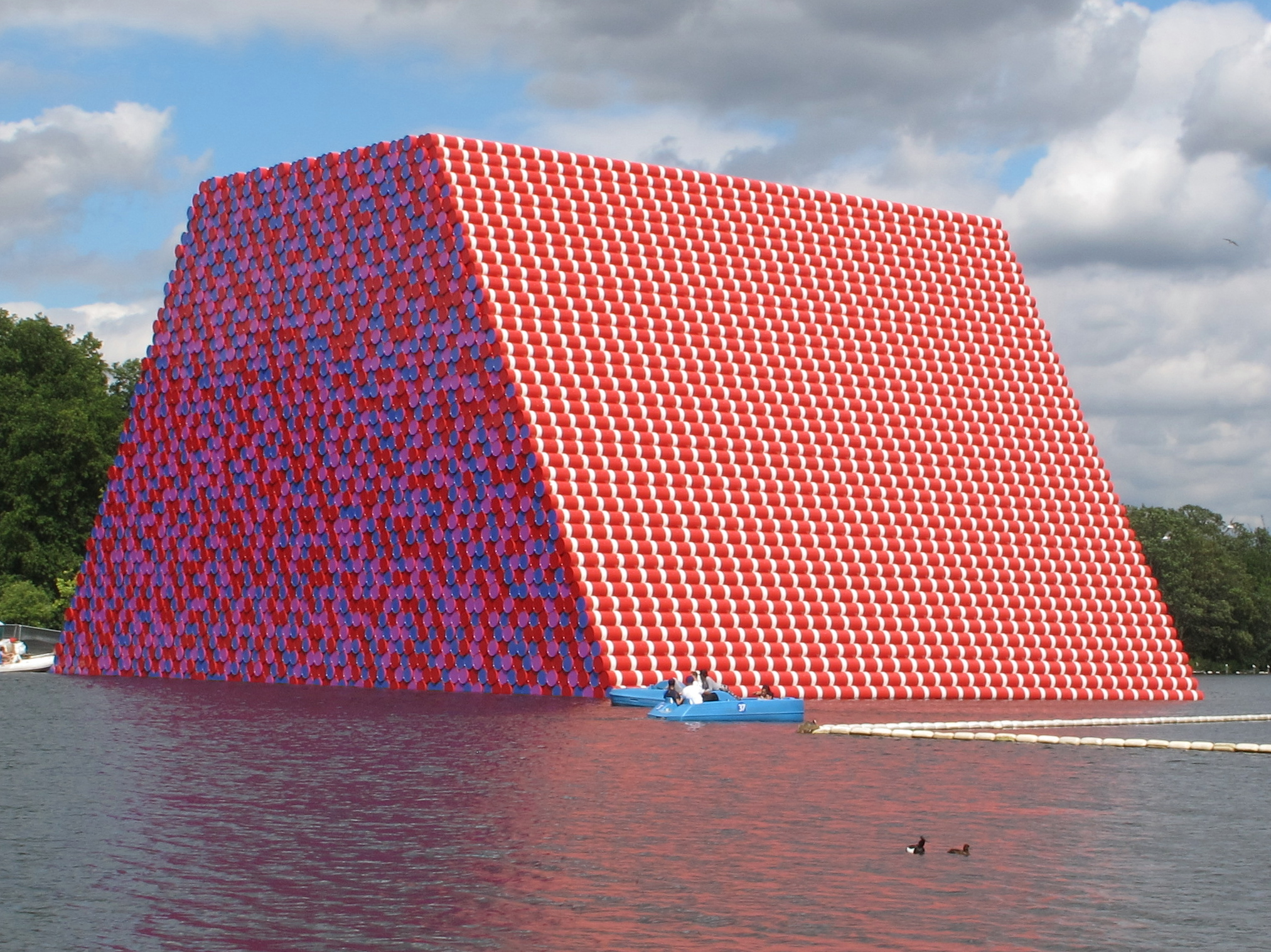
Many of Christo and Jeanne-Claude's temporary installations, such as The London Mastaba (pictured), exemplify the in situ approach in art.

The concept of in situ in contemporary art developed in the late 1960s and 1970s, referring to works created for a specific site. Such works incorporate the site's physical, historical, political, and sociological characteristics as integral elements of their composition. This approach contrasts with autonomous artistic production, where artworks are conceived independently of their display location. Theoretical discussions, particularly in the writings and practice of French conceptual artist and sculptor Daniel Buren, have addressed the dynamic relationship between artistic intervention and its surrounding environment.

The installations of Christo and Jeanne-Claude are examples of the in situ principles applied in art. Their large-scale installations such as The Pont Neuf Wrapped (1985) and Wrapped Reichstag (1995) involved the wrapping of buildings and landscape elements in fabric, temporarily transforming familiar spaces and therefore altering public perception of the spaces. Another example is the land art movement, wherein artists such as Robert Smithson and Michael Heizer integrated their works directly into natural landscapes. In contemporary aesthetic discourse, in situ describes practices that reinforce the fundamental unity between an artwork and its site.

==== Law ====
In legal contexts, in situ is often used for its literal sense, meaning 'in its original place'. In Hong Kong, in-situ land exchange refers to a mechanism whereby landowners can swap their existing or expired land leases for new grants covering the same land parcel. This approach facilitates redevelopment—such as modernizing buildings or increasing land usage density—in a crowded, land-scarce environment without displacing ownership from the original location. The Hong Kong government, through the Development Bureau and Lands Department, has implemented arrangements to expedite lease modifications and land exchanges.

In public international law, the term in situ is used to distinguish between a government that exercises effective control over a state's territory and population and a government-in-exile, which operates from outside its national borders. A government in situ is the de facto governing authority, while a government-in-exile may still claim legitimacy despite lacking territorial control. The recognition of a government generally depends on its ability to maintain authority over its state, though exceptions exist, particularly when a government-in-exile is displaced due to unlawful foreign occupation.

==== Linguistics ====
In linguistics, particularly in syntax, an element is described as in situ when it is pronounced in the same position where it receives its semantic interpretation. This concept is especially relevant in the analysis of wh- questions across languages. For example, in Mandarin Chinese and Kurdish, wh-elements remain in situ, producing structures analogous to "John bought what?" where the interrogative word occupies the same syntactic position as the direct object would in a declarative sentence ("John bought bread"). By contrast, languages like English and French typically employ wh-movement, where the interrogative element is displaced from its base position to the beginning of the clause, as in "What did John buy?" Here, the wh-word what has moved from its original post-verbal position to the sentence-initial position, leaving behind a trace or gap in the object position. This typological distinction between in situ wh-elements and moved wh-elements represents one of the fundamental parameters of variation in natural language syntax and has been extensively studied within generative grammar frameworks.

=== Social sciences ===
==== Economics ====
In economics, in situ storage refers to the practice of retaining a product, usually a natural resource, in its original location rather than extracting and storing it elsewhere. This method avoids direct out-of-pocket costs, such as those for transportation or storage facilities, with the primary expense being the opportunity cost of delaying potential revenue. It applies to resources like oil and gas left unextracted in wells, minerals and gemstones remaining underground, and timber left standing until extraction is economically favorable. Certain agricultural products, such as hay, can be stored in situ under suitable conditions.

==== Psychology ====
In psychology, in situ typically refers to studies conducted in a natural or real-world setting, as opposed to a controlled laboratory environment. This approach allows researchers to observe and measure psychological processes as they occur, increasing ecological validity—though often at the expense of experimental control over variables.

=== Miscellaneous ===
==== Gastronomy ====
In gastronomy, in situ refers to the art of cooking with the different resources that are available at the site of the event. Here a person is not going to the restaurant, but the restaurant comes to the person's home.

==== Mining ====
In situ leaching or in situ recovery refers to the mining technique of injecting lixiviant underground to dissolve ore and bringing the pregnant leach solution to surface for extraction. Commonly used in uranium mining but has also been used for copper mining.

== See also ==
- In situ conservation
- Ex situ conservation
- List of colossal sculptures in situ
- List of Latin phrases
- Neoclassical compound – Compound words composed from Latin or ancient Greek
