= Epaxial and hypaxial muscles =

Trunk muscles

In adult vertebrates, trunk muscles can be broadly divided into hypaxial muscles, which lie ventral to the horizontal septum of the vertebrae and epaxial muscles, which lie dorsal to the septum. Hypaxial muscles include some vertebral muscles, the diaphragm, the abdominal muscles, and all limb muscles. The serratus posterior inferior and serratus posterior superior are innervated by the ventral primary ramus and are hypaxial muscles. Epaxial muscles include other (dorsal) muscles associated with the vertebrae, ribs, and base of the skull. In humans, the erector spinae, the transversospinales (including the multifidus, semispinalis and rotatores), the splenius and suboccipital muscles are the only epaxial muscles.

Hypaxial and epaxial muscles develop directly from somitic cells. Differentiation of hypaxial and epaxial muscles is postulated to have evolved as a new trait in vertebrate animals.

== Location ==
The hypaxial muscles are located on the ventral side of the body, often below the horizontal septum in many species (primarily fish and amphibians). In all species, the hypaxial muscles are innervated by the ventral ramus (branch) of the spinal nerves, while the epaxial muscles are innervated by the dorsal ramus.
