= Hyperextension (exercise) =

Body exercise

Back extensions being performed using a Roman chair for support

A hyperextension or back extension is an exercise that works the lower back as well as the mid and upper back, specifically the erector spinae muscles. There are two erector spinae, one on either side of the spine, that run along its length. These are formed of three smaller muscles – spinalis, longissimus, and iliocostalis.

== Hyperextension explained ==
"Hyperextension" in the case of the exercise simply means actively extending the spine (ie: arching back as opposed to flexion or curling forward) from a deficit (a flexed or forward bent) position. Anatomically, this is considered simply "flexion" and is not related to the joint condition "hyperextension," or joint hypermobility, where a joint bends beyond what is normally expected, or a "hyperextension injury," where a joint is forced beyond its articular range of motion.

== Equipment used ==
Back extension performed at an angle using an exercise ball

Back extensions can be performed with or without various equipment.

Without any equipment
It may be performed on the ground by lying prone with arms overhead and lifting the arms, upper torso, and legs as far as possible. Gravity provides resistance to strengthen the back extensor muscles.

Diagonal back extensions performed on the floor

Using a Roman chair
A Roman chair helps to stabilize the legs up until the hip joints while performing low back extension. The torso from above the hip joints is flexed forwards and down towards the floor. The exercise is completed by contracting the back (erector spinae muscles) and raising the torso so the body is in a straight line from head to heels. The exercise can be enhanced by holding weights to the chest. Lighter weights may be used to begin with to prevent straining the back muscles with over-exertion. The weight may be held in a lower position by a beginner, then gradually held higher, to feel more resistance.

Using a back extension bench (hyperextension bench)
There are two varieties of back extension benches depending upon the angle that they support your lower body, the 45 degrees and 90 degrees back extension bench. The 90 degrees bench is also called a Roman chair. Here the body lies horizontally where the full range of motion is experienced. Using the 45 degree bench, the exerciser is almost standing, which allows extension only up to a partial range of motion. In both versions, the exerciser fold the arms in front or place the hands on the back of the head with the elbows pointing to the sides, while performing the exercise.

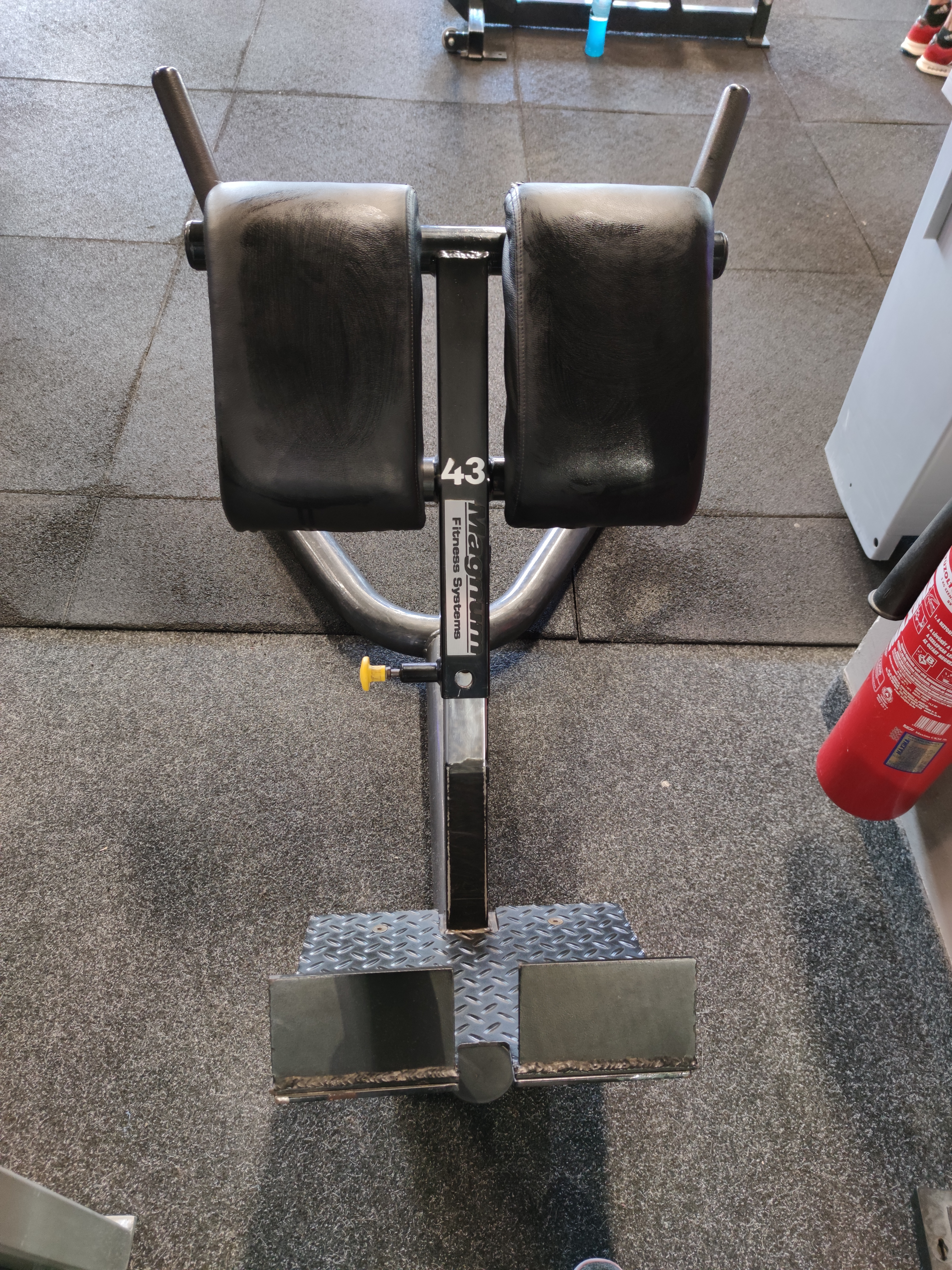
A 45 degree back extension bench (note the different type of leg support from the Roman chair)

Using a reverse back extension machine (reverse hyperextension machine)
This machine has been used to strengthen not only the erector spinae muscle, but also gluteus maximus and part of hamstring muscles (biceps femoris). When back extension is attempted with this machine, the range of motion at hip is found to be relatively more, while the accompanying stresses at hip and back have been found not to relatively less.

== See also ==
- Extension (kinesiology)
- Hyperextension and Unclarity of its Meaning
