= Segmental stabilizers =

Muscles which provide support across joints

In anatomy and physiology, segmental stabilizers are the muscles which provide support across joints, as in the multifidus across spinal vertebrae.

== In fitness ==
Segmental stabilizers align bones, such as the spine, so as to reduce stress during movement. They are primarily enlisted during functional movement and balance training.
