= Adcon-L =

Pharmaceutical gel

Adcon-L is a pharmaceutical gel designed to reduce the incidence and severity of scarring in back operations. It consists of a combination of marginally water-soluble artificial sugars, and is re-absorbed into the body within several months of application. This gel was marketed in the United States by Gliatech, approved by the FDA in 1997, and eventually sold to Wright Medical Technologies in result of Gliatech going bankrupt.

== Trials ==
Four randomized controlled trials of particular interest were done regarding Adcon-L's effect on scarring and clinical outcomes. Three of these tests were done in Europe and one in the United States. Together, the trials consisted of 468 patients treated with the gel and 473 patients acting as a control group. The first trial done determined that the adhesion reduced the severity of the scarring post-operation as well as have minor improvements in clinical outcomes. The second trial (occurring in the United States) at first agreed with the first trial but the results were then given to independent investigators. These investigators declared there was no effect on the scarring using Adcon-L or any effect on the clinical outcome after 6 months.

These two trials led to different conclusions. Based on the first trial and the original study from the second, the gel reduces scars but no certain benefit in clinical outcome. The other conclusion is based on the first trial and the reworked second trial, claiming that the results suggest that the practical use of Adcon-L can not recommended due to the conflicting results. Two other randomized controlled trials were then done, both concluding that there are no effects on the scaring or clinical outcome regarding Adcon-L. Based on these four trial, no strong conclusions are made.
