= Roman chair =

Exercise equipment

Hyperextension exercise being performed using a Roman chair for support

The Roman chair is a piece of exercise equipment. It is mainly used for the lower back, but can also target the buttocks, hamstrings, and abdomen.

== Exercises ==
=== Hyperextensions ===
Bodyweight can provide significant resistance, while additional weight held by the person exercising increases difficulty. Two actions are performed while doing hyperextensions on a Roman chair. The body is bent forward at the hips, lowering the body towards the floor. The body is then lifted to straighten the back again, to return to the start position and complete one repetition (see animation, above).

=== Sit-ups ===
The Roman chair is also used to perform exercises for the abdomen. An exerciser lies supine with their hips supported on the rear (weight on the gluteus maximus) as they bend backward and lift themselves up with their rectus abdominis while stabilizing the pelvis with the hip flexors. If the pelvis moves during the exercise then the hip flexors will also be dynamic prime movers.

A common exercise using the Roman chair for targeting the abdominal muscles is the "Roman chair sit-ups". It is an old-school exercise known to strengthen the belly. It can also strengthen some secondary stabilizer muscles in the core.

=== Knee extension ===
An exercise more commonly referred to as the wall sit, an isometric movement to build strength in the quadriceps, may also be called the Roman chair. It involves a person with their back against the wall, pushing into it using the action of knee extension. Even though it is called a "sit", the hips are actually not being held up by sitting on something. Rather, the body is held up via a combination of weight bearing on the feet and friction created with the wall by exerting pressure against it.

Another exercise called the "Roman chair squat" requires using the quadriceps dynamically. It similarly mimics a sitting motion without actually sitting down on something, and can be done on an apparatus similar to the aforementioned spinal exercises. This is similar to a "sissy squat".
