= Transversospinales =

Muscles of the spine

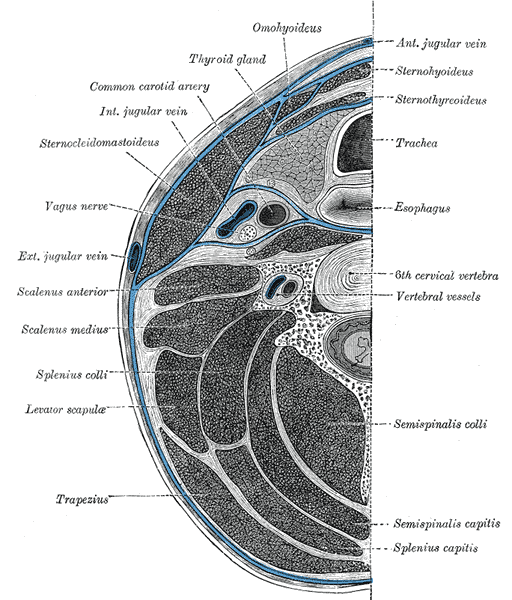
- Section of the neck at about the level of the sixth cervical vertebra. Showing the arrangement of the fascia coli.

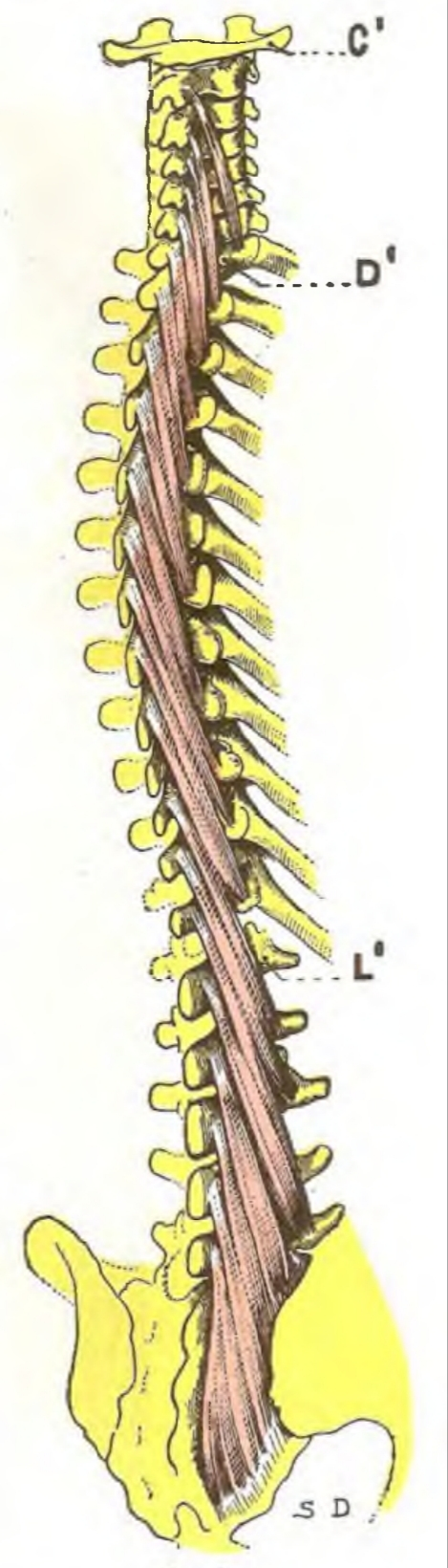
- The transversospinalis set of muscles; right side, posterolateral view. C1, First cervical vertebra — 2, D1, First thoracic vertebra — L1, First lumbar vertebra. (After Testut's Anatomy.)

Details
- Origin: Transverse process
- Insertion: Spinous process
- Nerve: Posterior ramus of spinal nerve
- Actions: Extend vertebral column (bilateral contraction); rotate vertebral column (unilateral contraction)

Identifiers
- Latin: musculi transversospinales
- TA98: A04.3.02.201
- TA2: 2275
- FMA: 71304

The transversospinales are a group of muscles of the human back. Their combined action is rotation and extension of the vertebral column. These muscles are small and have a poor mechanical advantage for contributing to motion. They include: the three semispinalis muscles, the multifidus muscle, and the rotatores spinae muscles.

== Location ==
The three semispinalis muscles, span 4-6 vertebral segments:

  - semispinalis thoracis
  - semispinalis cervicis
  - semispinalis capitis

The multifidus muscle, and spans 2-4 vertebral segments

The rotatores muscles, lie beneath the multifidus, and spans 1-2 vertebral segments

  - rotatores cervicis
  - rotatores thoracis
  - rotatores lumborum
