= Functional movement =

Movements based on situational biomechanics

Functional movements are movements based on real-world situational biomechanics. They usually involve multi-planar, multi-joint movements which place demand on the body's core musculature and innervation. They may be measured via a functional movement screen.

== Functional vs other movements ==
=== Sports-specific ===
Sports-specific movements, such as a tennis swing or bowling a cricket ball, are based on sports-specific situations. While there is some cross-over application from sports-specific movements (such as running), they are usually so specific that they supersede functional movements in complexity. Yet both sports and functional movements are dependent on the body's core.

=== Muscle-specific ===
Traditional weight-lifting depends on muscle-specific program-design with the goal of muscle-specific hypertrophy. For example, a concentration biceps curl attempts to isolate the biceps brachii, although by gripping the weight one also engages the wrist flexors. These exercises tend to be the most far-removed from functional movement, due to their attempt to micromanage the variables acting on the individual muscles. Functional exercises, on the other hand, attempt to incorporate as many variables as possible (balance, multiple joints, multiple planes of movement), thus decreasing the load on the muscle but increasing the complexity of motor coordination and flexibility.

== Biomechanics ==
Functional movement usually involves gross motor movement involving the core, which refers to the muscles of the abdomen and spine, such as segmental stabilizers.

== See also ==
- Biomechanics
- Core (anatomy)
- Functional training
- Erwan Le Corre, trainer in a form of functional movement known as "MovNat"
