= Albert C. Broders =

American surgical pathologist (1885–1964)

Albert Compton Broders (August 8, 1885 – March 27, 1964) was an American surgical pathologist best known for developing the numerical tumor grading system, which evaluates cancer prognosis based on cellular differentiation. His work laid the foundation for modern cancer staging and personalized oncology.

== Early life and education ==
Broders was born in Fairfax County, Virginia, on August 8, 1885. He attended Potomac Academy in Alexandria, Virginia. He enrolled at the Medical College of Virginia (MCV), where he earned his medical degree in 1910. He completed a one-year internship at Charlotte Williams Memorial Hospital in Richmond, Virginia, intending to become a surgeon. However, his interest shifted to surgical pathology after spending extensive time studying excised specimens. Following the internship, Broders became an assistant to Charles R. Robins at MCV, assisting in surgeries, administering anesthesia, and examining pathological specimens. In 1911, Robins arranged for Broders to train at Johns Hopkins Hospital under surgeon Joseph Colt Bloodgood, where Broders learned the frozen section procedure, a rapid method for microscopic tissue analysis.

== Career ==
In 1912, Broders joined the Mayo Clinic as an assistant in surgical pathology. He became the head of the section in 1922 and remained at the clinic until 1950. He built and resided in two historic homes in the Pill Hill Historic District of Rochester Minnesota. After leaving the Mayo Clinic, he served as a senior consultant in surgical pathology at the Scott and White Clinic in Temple, Texas, until he died from complications of a stroke in 1964.

Broders introduced the numerical tumor grading system in The Journal of the American Medical Association in 1920 in his article, "Squamous-Cell Epithelioma of the Lip: A Study of 537 Cases". Based on his analysis of 537 cases of squamous-cell carcinoma of the lip, he classified tumors according to their degree of cellular differentiation on a scale of one to four. This system improved the accuracy of patient prognosis and influenced the development of personalized cancer treatments. His work served as the basis for the Dukes classification for colorectal cancer, later developed by English physician and pathologist Cuthbert Dukes.

In a 1932 paper, Broders introduced both the term and the concept of carcinoma in situ, describing abnormal cells confined to their original location (in situ) without invasion of surrounding tissue. Unlike his tumor grading system, which was widely accepted by surgeons and pathologists of the time, the concept of carcinoma in situ was debated for years.
