= Iliocostalis =

Muscle of the spine

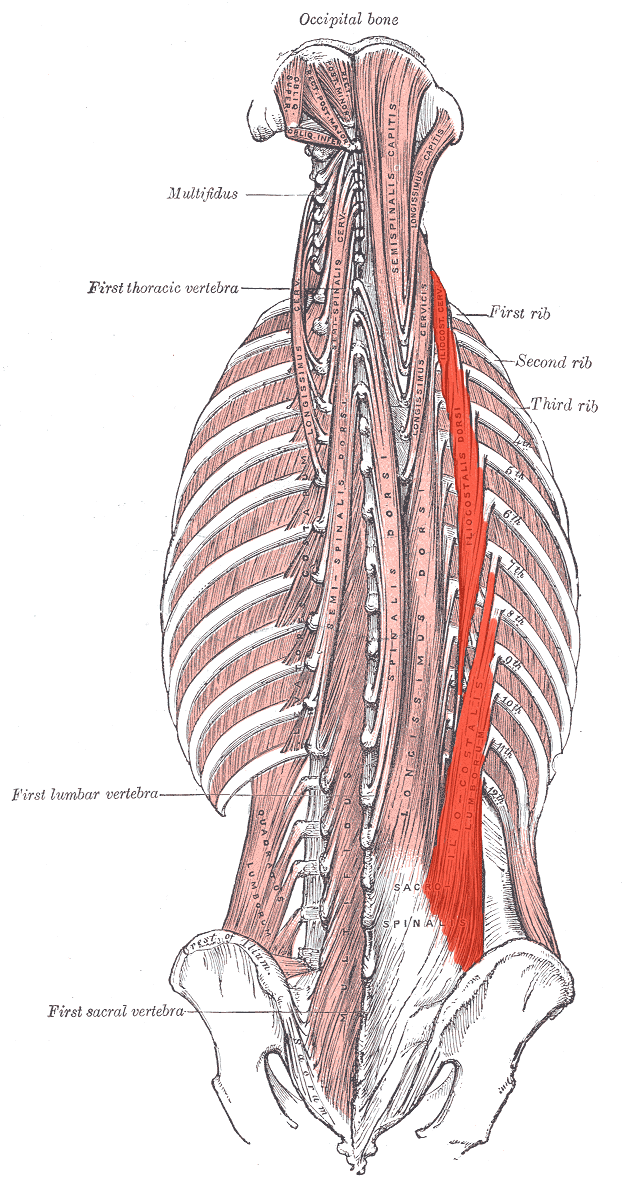
- Deep muscles of the back. (Iliocostalis lumborum visible at bottom right, iliocostalis dorsi visible at center right.)

Details
- Origin: Sacrum, iliac crest, thoracolumbar fascia, spinous processes of vertebrae from T11 - L5
- Insertion: Ribs
- Artery: Intercostal and lumbar arteries
- Nerve: Posterior branch of spinal nerve
- Actions: Unilaterally: laterally flex the vertebral column to the same side. Bilaterally: Extend the vertebral column.
- Antagonist: Rectus abdominis muscle

Identifiers
- Latin: musculus iliocostalis
- TA98: A04.3.02.005
- TA2: 2257
- FMA: 77177

Iliocostalis muscle is the muscle immediately lateral to the longissimus that is the nearest to the furrow that separates the epaxial muscles from the hypaxial. It lies very deep to the fleshy portion of the serratus posterior muscle. It laterally flexes the vertebral column to the same side.

== Structure ==
Iliocostalis muscle has a common origin from the iliac crest, the sacrum, the thoracolumbar fascia, and the spinous processes of the vertebrae from T11 to L5.

Iliocostalis cervicis (cervicalis ascendens) arises from the angles of the third, fourth, fifth, and sixth ribs, and is inserted into the posterior tubercles of the transverse processes of the fourth, fifth, and sixth cervical vertebrae.

Iliocostalis thoracis (musculus accessorius; iliocostalis thoracis) arises by flattened tendons from the upper borders of the angles of the lower six ribs medial to the tendons of insertion of the iliocostalis lumborum; these become muscular, and are inserted into the upper borders of the angles of the upper six ribs and into the back of the transverse process of the seventh cervical vertebra.

Iliocostalis lumborum (iliocostalis muscle; sacrolumbalis muscle) is inserted, by flattened tendons, into the inferior borders of the angles of the lower six to nine ribs.

=== Nerve supply ===
Iliocostalis muscle is supplied by the dorsal rami of spinal nerves.

== Function ==
Iliocostalis muscle laterally flexes the vertebral column to the same side. It bilaterally extends the vertebral column.

== See also ==
- Erector spinae muscles
- Longissimus muscles
- Semispinalis muscles
- Spinalis muscle
- Triangle of auscultation
