= Spinalis =

Portion of the erector spinae

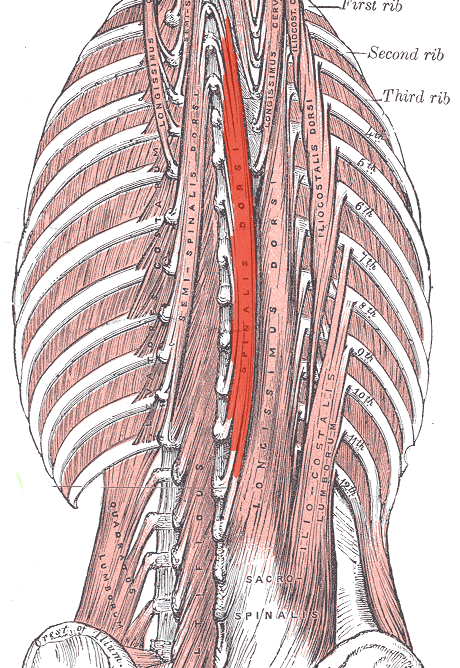
- Deep muscles of the back (spinalis dorsi visible at center. Other spinalis muscles not visible).

Details
- Origin: Thoracis: Spinous process of upper lumbar and lower thoracic vertebrae. Cervicis: nuchal ligament and spinous process of C7.
- Insertion: Thoracis: Spinous process of upper thoracic vertebrae. Cervicis: Spinous process of cervical vertebrae except atlas.
- Artery: Lateral sacral artery
- Nerve: Posterior branch of spinal nerve
- Actions: Laterally: Flex the head and neck to the same side. Bilaterally: Extend the vertebral column.
- Antagonist: Rectus abdominis muscle

Identifiers
- Latin: musculus spinalis
- TA98: A04.3.02.015
- TA2: 2267
- FMA: 77179

The spinalis is one of the erector spinae muscles, a bundle of skeletal muscles, located nearest to the spine. It is divided into three parts: Spinalis dorsi, spinalis cervicis, and spinalis capitis.

== Spinalis dorsi ==
Spinalis dorsi, the medial continuation of the sacrospinalis, is scarcely separable as a distinct muscle. It is situated at the medial side of the longissimus dorsi, and is intimately blended with it; it arises by three or four tendons from the spinous processes of the first two lumbar and the last two thoracic vertebrae: these, uniting, form a small muscle which is inserted by separate tendons into the spinous processes of the upper thoracic vertebrae, the number varying from four to eight.

It is intimately united with the semispinalis dorsi, situated beneath it.

== Spinalis cervicis ==
Spinalis cervicis, or spinalis colli, is an inconstant muscle, which arises from the lower part of the nuchal ligament, the spinous process of the seventh cervical, and sometimes from the spinous processes of the first and second thoracic vertebrae, and is inserted into the spinous process of the axis, and occasionally into the spinous processes of the two cervical vertebrae below it.

== Spinalis capitis ==
Spinalis capitis (biventer cervicis) is usually inseparably connected with the semispinalis capitis.

Spinalis capitis is not well characterized in modern anatomy textbooks and atlases, and is often omitted from anatomical illustration. However, it can be identified as fibers that extend from the spinous processes of TV1 and CV7 to the cranium, often blending with semispinalis capitis

== See also ==
- Iliocostalis
- Longissimus
- Semispinalis muscle
