= Erector spinae muscles =

Human muscle group

Erector spinae
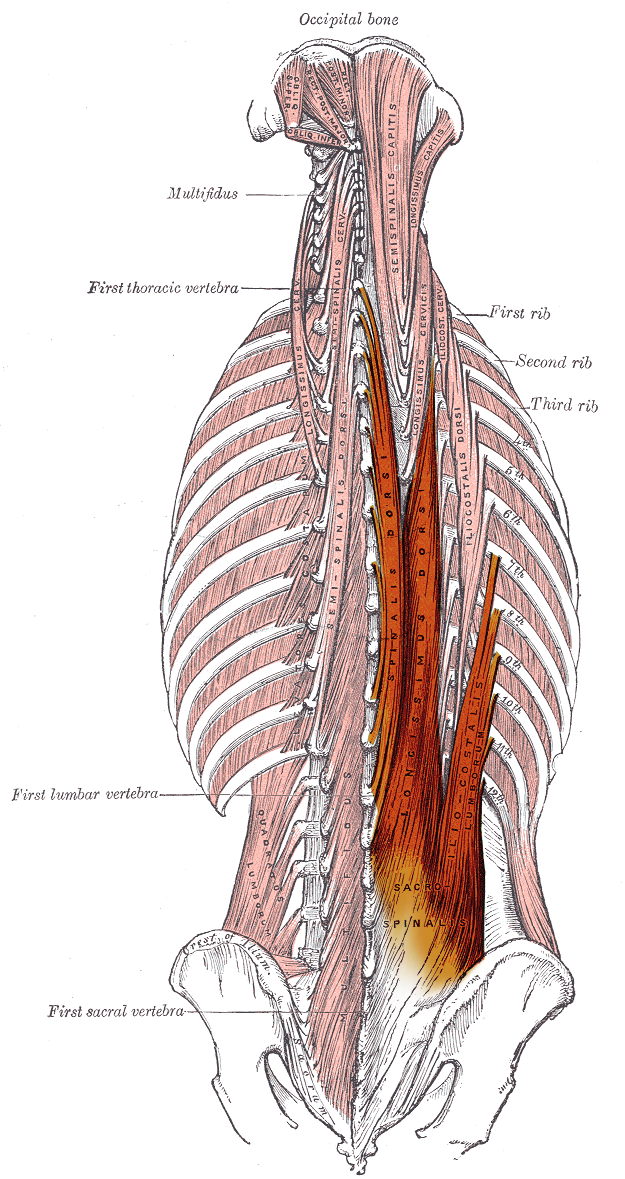
- The erector spinae muscle group

Details
- Origin: Spinous processes of T9-T12 thoracic vertebrae, medial slope of the dorsal segment of iliac crest
- Insertion: Spinous processes of T1 and T2 thoracic vertebrae and the cervical vertebrae
- Artery: Lateral sacral artery
- Nerve: Posterior branch of spinal nerve
- Actions: Extends the vertebral column
- Antagonist: Rectus abdominis muscle

Identifiers
- Latin: musculus erector spinae
- TA98: A04.3.02.002
- TA2: 2254
- FMA: 71302

The erector spinae (/ɪˈrɛktər ˈspaɪni/ irr-EK-tər SPY-nee) or spinal erectors is a set of muscles that straighten and rotate the back. The spinal erectors work together with the glutes (gluteus maximus, gluteus medius and gluteus minimus) to maintain stable posture standing or sitting.

== Structure ==
The erector spinae is not just one muscle, but a group of muscles and tendons which run more or less the length of the spine on the left and the right, from the sacrum, or sacral region, and hips to the base of the skull. They are also known as the sacrospinalis group of muscles. These muscles lie on either side of the spinous processes of the vertebrae and extend throughout the lumbar, thoracic, and cervical regions. The erector spinae is covered in the lumbar and thoracic regions by the thoracolumbar fascia, and in the cervical region by the nuchal ligament.

This large muscular and tendinous mass varies in size and structure at different parts of the vertebral column. In the sacral region, it is narrow and pointed, and at its origin chiefly tendinous in structure. In the lumbar region, it is larger, and forms a thick fleshy mass. Further up, it is subdivided into three columns. They gradually diminish in size as they ascend to be inserted into the vertebrae and ribs.

The erector spinae are attached to the medial crest of the sacrum (a slightly raised feature of the sacrum closer towards the midline of the body as opposed to the "lateral" crest which is further away from the midline of the body), to the spinous processes of the lumbar, and the eleventh and twelfth thoracic vertebrae and the supraspinous ligament, to the back part of the inner lip of the iliac crests (the top border of the hips), and to the lateral crests of the sacrum, where it blends with the sacrotuberous and posterior sacroiliac ligaments.

Some of its fibers are continuous with the fibers of origin of the gluteus maximus.

The muscular fibers form a large fleshy mass that splits, in the upper lumbar region, into three columns, viz., a lateral (iliocostalis), an intermediate (longissimus), and a medial (spinalis). Each of these consists of three parts, inferior to superior, as follows:

=== Iliocostalis ===
The iliocostalis originates from the sacrum, erector spinae aponeurosis, and iliac crest. The iliocostalis has three different insertions according to the parts:

- iliocostalis lumborum has the lumbar part (where its insertion is in the 12th to 7th ribs).
- iliocostalis thoracis where its insertion runs from the last 6 ribs to the first 6 ribs.
- iliocostalis cervicis which runs from the first 6 ribs to the posterior tubercle of the transverse process of C6-C4.

=== Longissimus ===
The longissimus muscle is the intermediate and the largest of the three columns. It has three parts with different origin and insertion:

- longissimus thoracis originates from the sacrum, spinous processes of the lumbar vertebrae, and transverse process of the last thoracic vertebra and inserts in the transverse processes of the lumbar vertebrae, erector spinae aponeurosis, ribs, and costal processes of the thoracic vertebrae.
- longissimus cervicis originates from the transverse processes of T6-T1 and inserts in the transverse processes of C7-C2.
- longissimus capitis originates from the transverse processes of T3-T1, runs through C7-C3, and inserts in the mastoid process of the temporal bone.

=== Spinalis ===
The spinalis muscle is the smallest and most medial column. It has three parts:

- spinalis thoracis which originates from the spinous process of L3-T10 and inserts in the spinous process of T8-T2.
- spinalis cervicis originates from the spinous process of T2-C6 and inserts in the spinous process of C4-C2.
- spinalis capitis is an inconstant muscle fiber that runs from the cervical and upper thoracic and then inserts in the external occipital protuberance.

Insertion	Lateral column Iliocostalis	Intermediate column Longissimus	Medial column Spinalis
Lower thoracic vertebrae and ribs	I. lumborum		
Upper thoracic vertebrae and ribs	I. thoracis	L. thoracis	S. thoracis
Cervical vertebrae	I. cervicis	L. cervicis	S. cervicis
Skull		L. capitis	S. capitis

From lateral to medial, the erector spinae muscles can be remembered using the mnemonic, I Love Spine. I Iliocostalis, Love Longissimus and Spine Spinalis.

== Training ==
Below are examples of exercises by which the erector spinae can be strengthened for therapeutic or athletic purposes. Additionally, exercises of the glutes may also be beneficial to lower back health. Care should be taken to avoid injury to the lower back when targeting spinal erectors directly. Exercises include, but are not limited to:

- Bent-over row
- Deadlift
- Hyperextension
- Good-morning
- Pull-up (exercise)
- Rowing
- Squat
- Utkatasana
- Bridge (exercise)
- Plank (exercise)
- Push-up

== Additional images ==
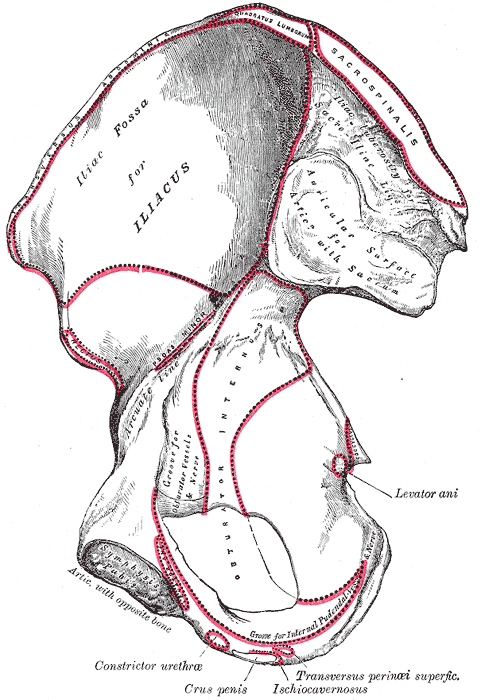
Right hip bone. Internal surface.

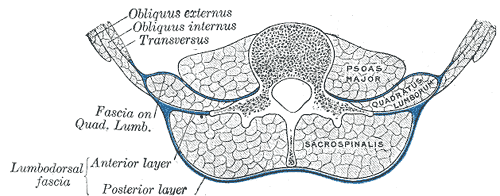
Diagram of a transverse section of the posterior abdominal wall, to show the disposition of the lumbodorsal fascia

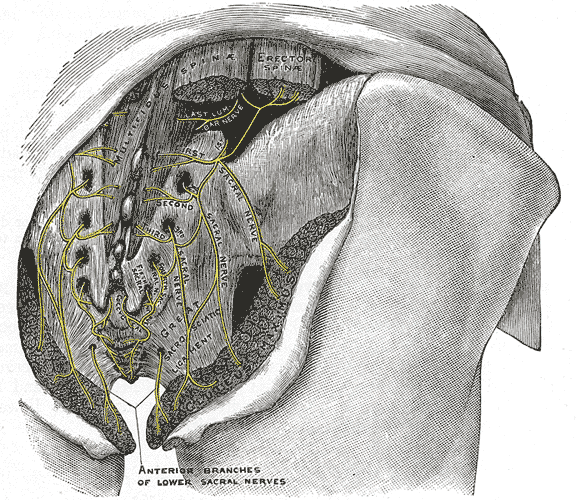
The posterior divisions of the sacral nerves

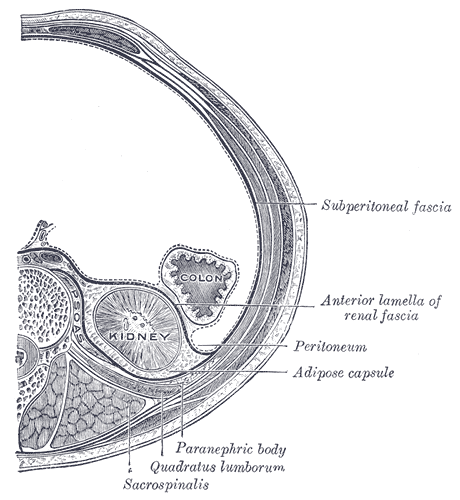
Transverse section, showing the relations of the capsule of the kidney

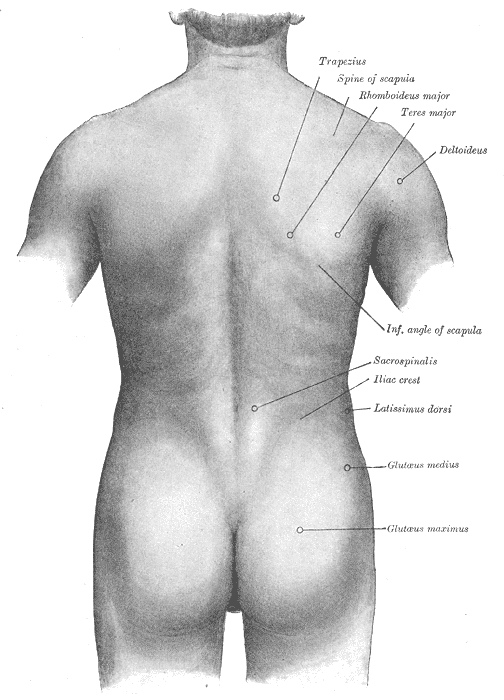
Surface anatomy of the back

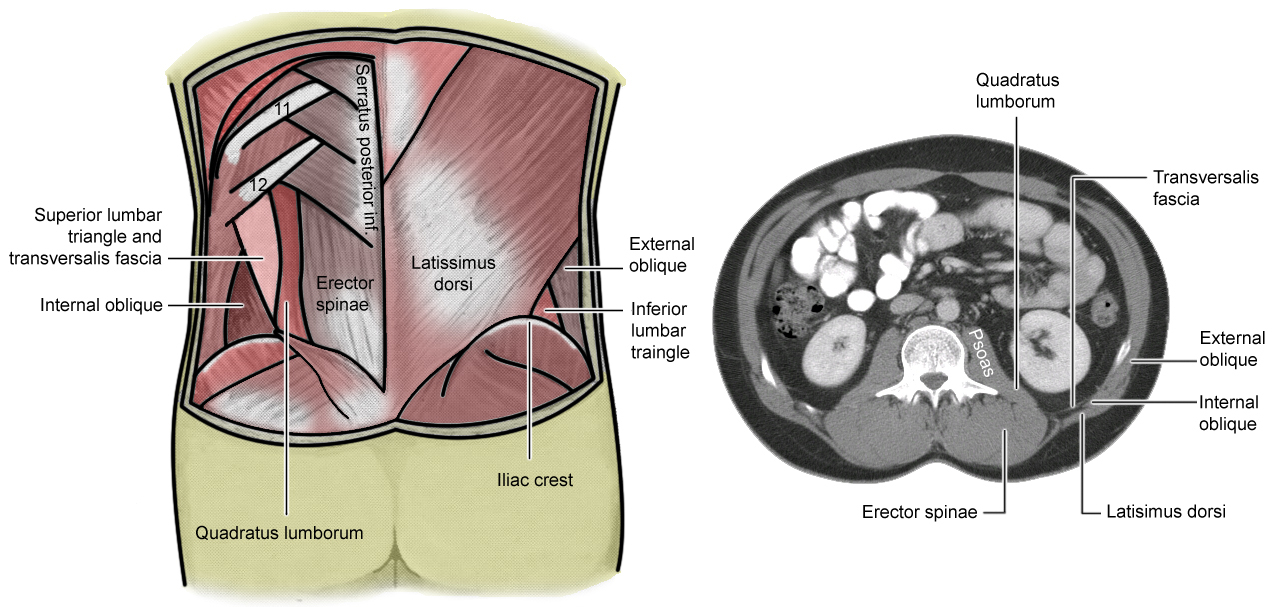
Lumbar triangle
