= Rotatores muscles =

Muscles of the spine

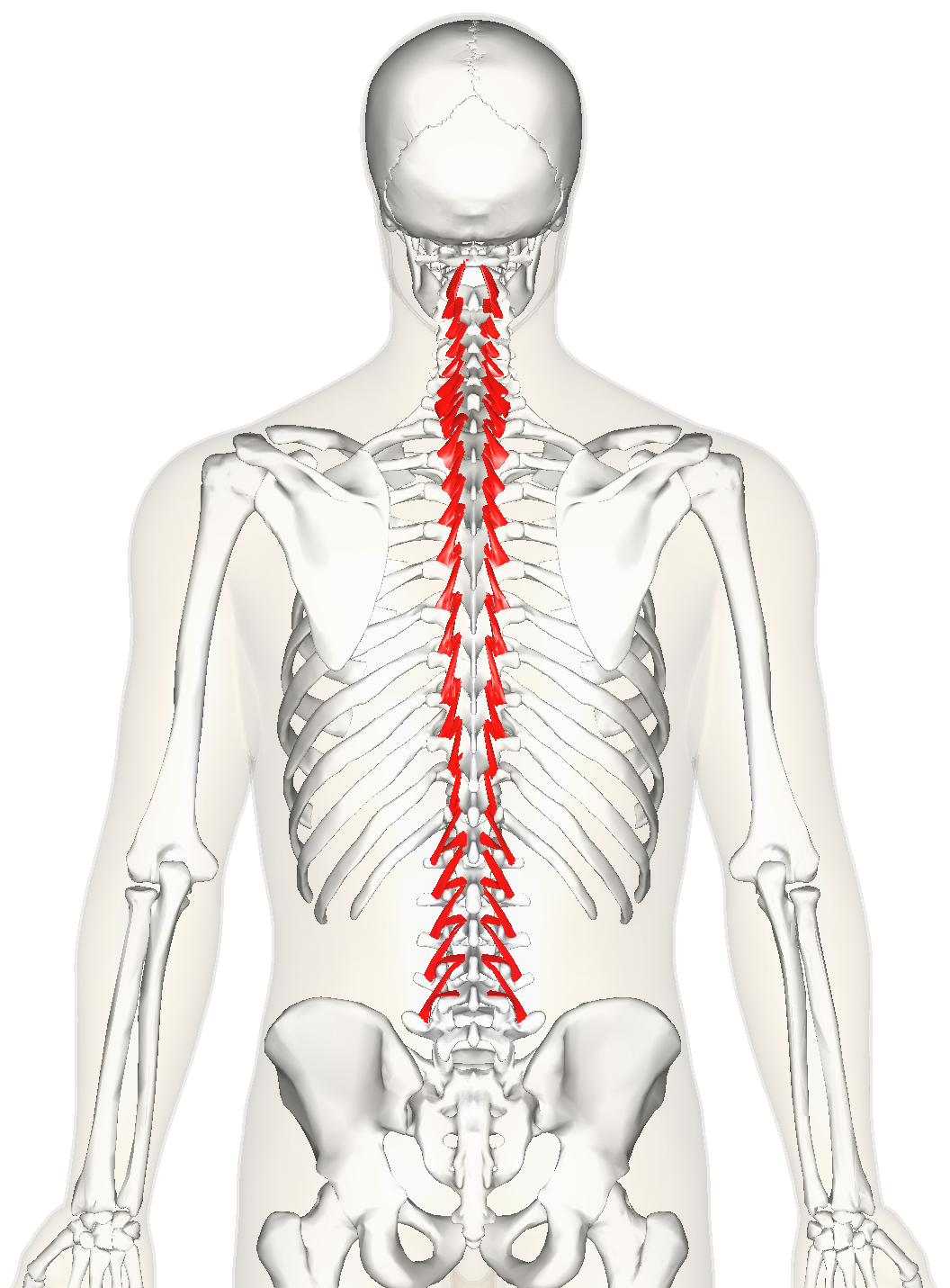
- The rotatores muscles as viewed from behind

Details
- Origin: Transverse process
- Insertion: Junction of transverse process and lamina, spinous process
- Nerve: Posterior rami of spinal nerves

Identifiers
- Latin: musculi rotatores
- TA98: A04.3.02.210
- TA2: 2284
- FMA: 23081

The rotatores muscles (rotatores spinae muscles) lie beneath the multifidus and are present in all spinal regions but are most prominent in the thoracic region.

Each muscle is small and somewhat quadrilateral in form and each segment contains a rotatores brevis and a rotatores longus portion; they arise from the superior and posterior part of the transverse process, and are inserted into the lower border and lateral surface of the lamina of the two vertebra above, the fibers extending as far as the root of the spinous process for the rotatores longus.

The first thoracic rotatores muscle is found between the first and second thoracic vertebrae; the last, between the eleventh and twelfth. Sometimes the number of these muscles is diminished by the absence of one or more from the upper or lower end. The rotatores muscles have a high density of proprioceptors and have been implicated in postural control.

== See also ==
- Multifidus muscle
