= Longissimus =

Muscle organ

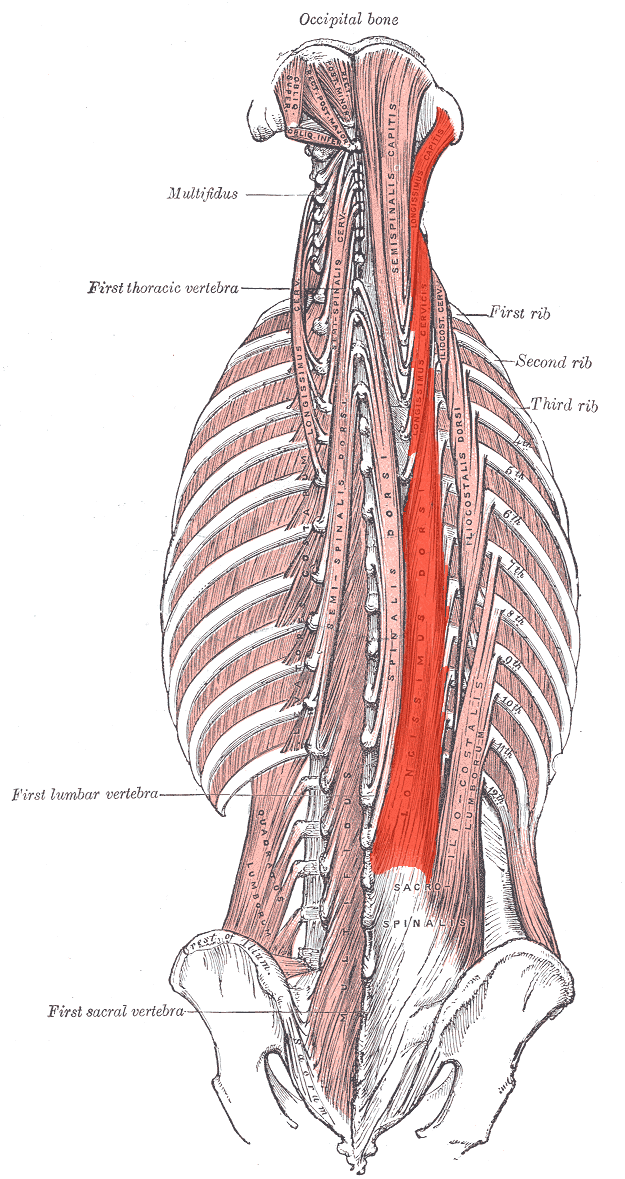
- Deep muscles of the back – longissimus capitis visible at top right, longisimus cervicis visible at center upper right, and longissimus dorsi visible at center right

Details
- Origin: Transverse process
- Insertion: Transverse process
- Artery: Lateral sacral artery
- Nerve: Posterior branch of spinal nerve
- Actions: Laterally: Flex the head and neck to the same side. Bilaterally: Extend the vertebral column.
- Antagonist: Rectus abdominis muscle

Identifiers
- Latin: musculus longissimus
- TA98: A04.3.02.010
- TA2: 2262
- FMA: 77178

The longissimus (Latin: the longest one) is the muscle lateral to the semispinalis muscles. It is the longest subdivision of the erector spinae muscles that extends forward into the transverse processes of the posterior cervical vertebrae.

== Structure ==
=== Longissimus thoracis et lumborum ===
The longissimus thoracis et lumborum is the intermediate and largest of the continuations of the erector spinae.

In the lumbar region (longissimus lumborum), where it is as yet blended with the iliocostalis, some of its fibers are attached to the whole length of the posterior surfaces of the transverse processes and the accessory processes of the lumbar vertebrae, and to the anterior layer of the lumbodorsal fascia.

In the thoracic region (longissimus thoracis), it is inserted, by rounded tendons, into the tips of the transverse processes of all the thoracic vertebrae, and by fleshy processes into the lower nine or ten ribs between their tubercles and angles.

=== Longissimus cervicis ===
The longissimus cervicis (transversalis cervicis), situated medial to the longissimus thoracis, arises by long, thin tendons from the summits of the transverse processes of thoracic vertebræ 1–5, and is inserted by similar tendons into the posterior tubercles of the transverse processes of cervical vertebrae 2–6.

=== Longissimus capitis ===
The longissimus capitis (trachelomastoid muscle) lies medial to the longissimus cervicis, between it and the semispinalis capitis.

It arises by tendons from the transverse processes of the upper five thoracic vertebrae, and the articular processes of the lower four cervical vertebrae, and is inserted into the posterior margin of the mastoid process, beneath the splenius capitis and sternocleidomastoid.

It is almost always crossed by a tendinous intersection near its insertion.

== See also ==
- Spinalis
