= Semispinalis muscles =

Group of three muscles belonging to the transversospinales

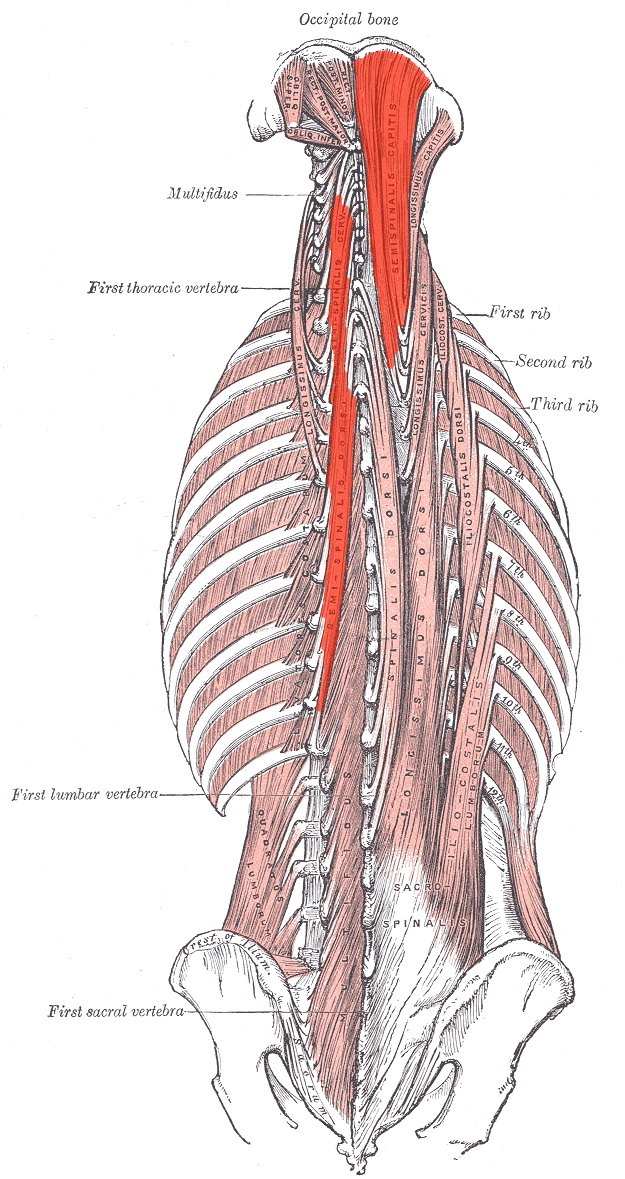
- Deep muscles of the back. Semispinalis muscles labelled and shown in red. Capitis uppermost, cervicis top centre left, thoracis centre right

- Semispinalis capitis

Details
- Nerve: Greater occipital nerve

Identifiers
- Latin: musculi semispinalis
- TA98: A04.3.02.206
- TA2: 2280
- FMA: 22823

The semispinalis muscles are a group of three muscles belonging to the transversospinales. These are the semispinalis capitis, the semispinalis cervicis and the semispinalis thoracis.

== Location ==
The semispinalis capitis (complexus) is situated at the upper and back part of the neck, deep to the splenius muscles, and medial to the longissimus cervicis and longissimus capitis. It arises by a series of tendons from the tips of the transverse processes of the upper six thoracic vertebrae, and from the articular and transverse processes of the lower four cervical vertebrae.

The tendons, uniting, form a broad muscle, which passes upward, and is inserted between the superior and inferior nuchal lines of the occipital bone. It lies deep to the trapezius muscle and can be palpated as a firm round muscle mass just lateral to the cervical spinous processes.

An intermediate tendinous intersection divides the muscle into an upper and a lower part, and is more marked in the medial bundles than in the lateral ones .

The semispinalis cervicis (or semispinalis colli), arises by a series of tendinous and fleshy fibers from the transverse processes of the upper six thoracic vertebrae, and is inserted into the cervical spinous processes, from the axis to the fifth cervical vertebrae inclusive. The semispinalis cervicis is thicker than the semispinalis thoracis. The fasciculus connected with the axis is the largest, and is chiefly muscular in structure.

The semispinalis thoracis (or semispinalis dorsi) muscle consists of thin, narrow, fleshy fasciculi, interposed between tendons of considerable length. It arises by a series of small tendons from the transverse processes of the sixth to the tenth thoracic vertebrae, and is inserted, by tendons, into the spinous processes of the upper four thoracic and lower two cervical vertebrae.

The semispinalis muscles are innervated by the dorsal rami of the cervical spinal nerves.

== See also ==
- List of muscles of the human body

== Additional images ==
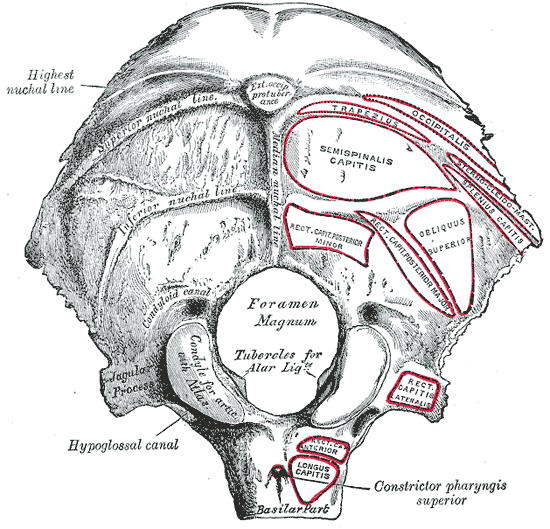
Occipital bone. Outer surface.

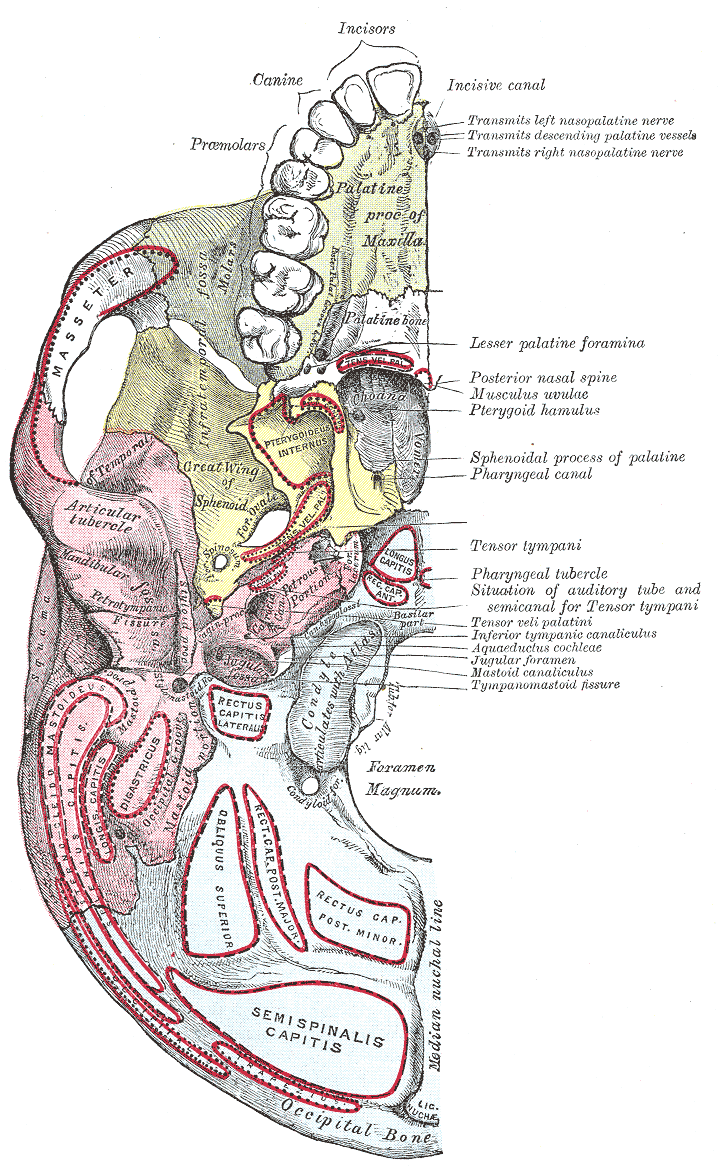
Base of skull. Inferior surface.

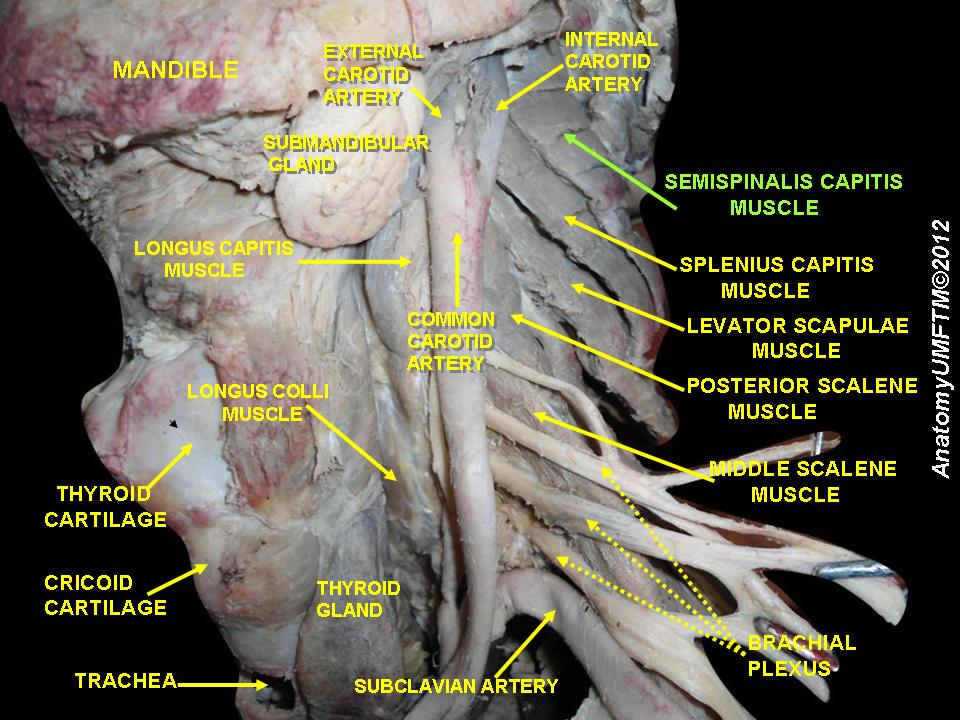
Semispinalis capitis muscle

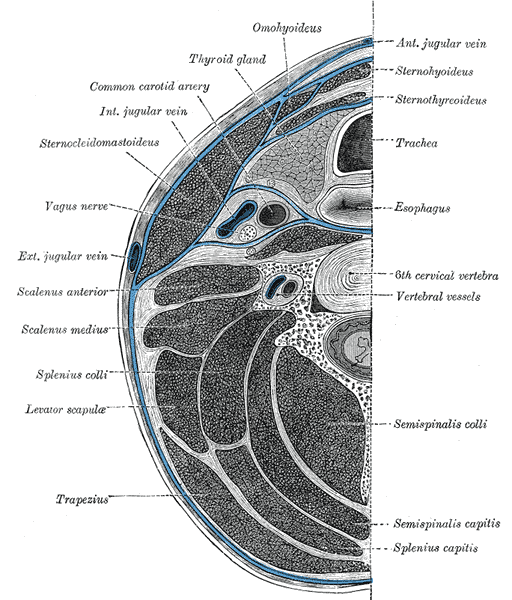
Section showing cervicis and fascia
