= Articulation of head of rib =

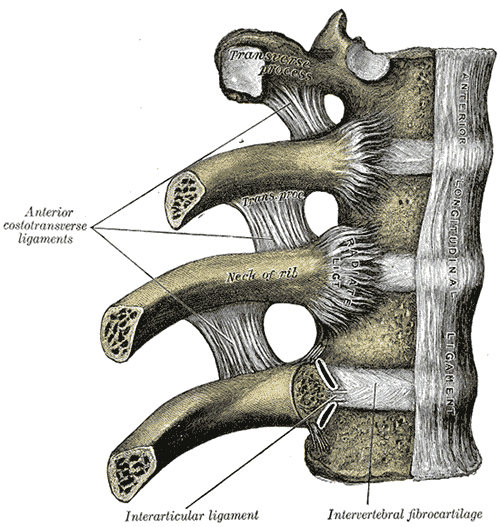
- The articulation of head of rib seen from the front

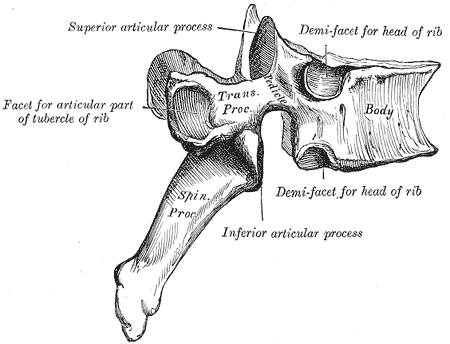
- Human thoracic vertebra. Notice the articulations for the ribs

Details

Identifiers
- Latin: articulatio capitis costae
- TA98: A03.3.04.002
- TA2: 1721
- FMA: 7951

The articulations of the heads of the ribs (or costocentral articulations) constitute a series of gliding or arthrodial joints, and are formed by the articulation of the heads of the typical ribs with the costal facets on the contiguous margins of the bodies of the thoracic vertebrae and with the intervertebral discs between them; the first, tenth, eleventh and twelfth ribs each articulate with a single vertebra.

Two convex facets from the head attach to two adjacent vertebrae, at the inferior costal facet of the superior vertebra, and the superior costal facet of the inferior vertebra respectively. This forms the synovial planar (gliding) joint.

The ligaments of the joints are:

- Intra-articular ligament of head of rib
- Radiate ligament of head of rib

== Additional images ==
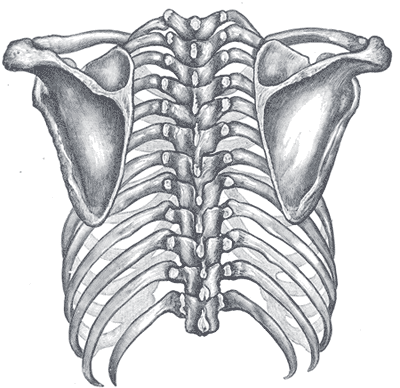
Orientation of the rib cage on the vertebral column
