= Costal facet =

Site of connection between a rib and a vertebra

A costal facet is a site of connection between a rib and a vertebra. The costal facets are located on the vertebrae that the rib articulates with. They are the superior costal facet, the inferior costal facet, and the transverse costal facet. Rib 1 only articulates with a transverse costal facet.

The superior costal facet joins the rib to the top of a vertebra. The transverse costal facet joins the rib to the transverse process of a vertebra, and the inferior costal facet joins the rib to the lower part of the vertebra. The joints formed are known as the costovertebral joints.
