= Rib =

Long bone in vertebrates that protects vital respiratory and cardiovascular organs

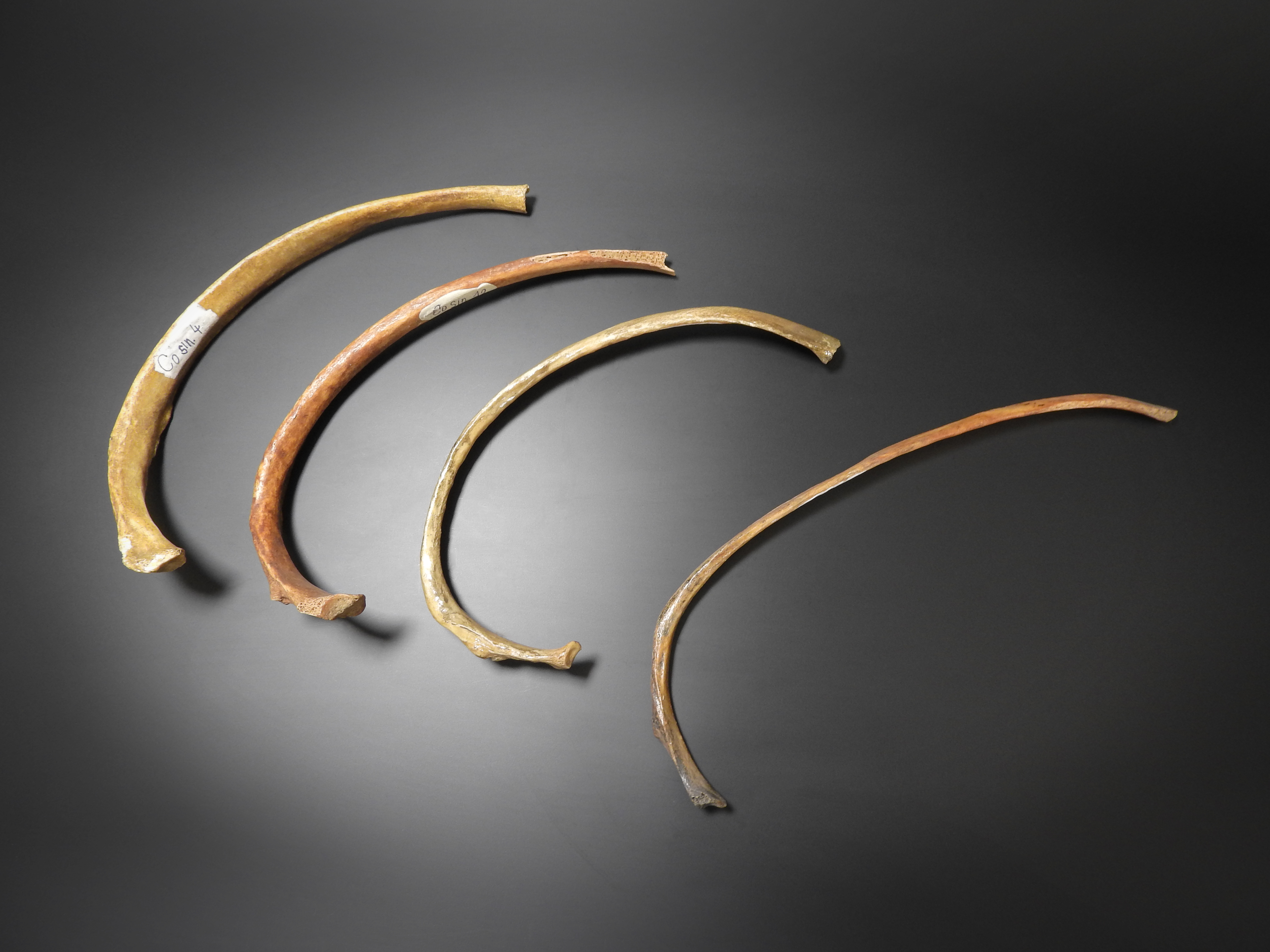
- Collection of single ribs in the Faculty of Education of Charles University

- Animation of all ribs, including the false ones in humans

Details

Identifiers
- Latin: costa
- MeSH: D012272
- TA98: A02.3.01.001
- TA2: 1105, 1118
- FMA: 7574

In vertebrate anatomy, ribs (Latin: costae) are the long curved bones which form the rib cage, part of the axial skeleton. In most tetrapods, ribs surround the thoracic cavity, enabling the lungs to expand and thus facilitate breathing by expanding the thoracic cavity. They serve to protect the lungs, heart, and other vital organs of the thorax. In some animals, especially snakes, ribs may provide support and protection for the entire body.

== Human anatomy ==
=== Rib details ===
Human ribs are flat bones that form part of the rib cage to help protect internal organs. Humans usually have 24 ribs, in 12 pairs. An extra cervical rib, on the right, left or both sides, may be present in 1 in 500 people. All are attached at the back to the thoracic vertebrae and are numbered from 1 to 12 according to the vertebrae to which they attach. The first rib is attached to thoracic vertebra 1 (T1). At the front of the body, most of the ribs are joined by costal cartilage to the sternum. Ribs connect to vertebrae at the costovertebral joints.

The parts of a rib includes the head, neck, body (or shaft), tubercle, and angle.

The head of the rib lies next to a vertebra. The ribs connect to the vertebrae with two costovertebral joints, one on the head and one on the neck. The head of the rib has a superior and an inferior articulating region, separated by a crest. These articulate with the superior and inferior costal facets on the connecting vertebrae. The crest gives attachment to the intra-articulate ligament that joins the rib to the vertebra of the same number, at the intervertebral disc. Another ligament, the radiate ligament joins the head of the rib to both the body of the upper vertebra and to the body of the lower vertebra. The smaller middle part of the ligament connects to the intervertebral disc. This plane joint is known as the articulation of the head of the rib.

The other costovertebral joint is that between the tubercle on the neck and the transverse process of the corresponding thoracic vertebra, known as the costotransverse joint. The superior costotransverse ligament attaches from the non-articular facet of the tubercle to the transverse process of the vertebra.

The neck of the rib is a flattened part that extends laterally from the head. The neck is about 3 cm long. Its anterior surface is flat and smooth, whilst its posterior is perforated by numerous foramina and its surface rough, to give attachment to the ligament of the neck. Its upper border presents a rough crest (crista colli costae) for the attachment of the anterior costotransverse ligament; its lower border is rounded.

A tubercle of rib on the posterior surface of the neck of the rib, has two facets (surfaces) one articulating and one non-articulating. The articular facet, is small and oval and is the lower and more medial of the two, and connects to the transverse costal facet on the thoracic vertebra of the same rib number. The transverse costal facet is on the end of the transverse process of the lower of the two vertebrae to which the head is connected. The non-articular portion is a rough elevation and affords attachment to the ligament of the tubercle. The tubercle is much more prominent in the upper ribs than in the lower ribs.

=== Rib cage ===
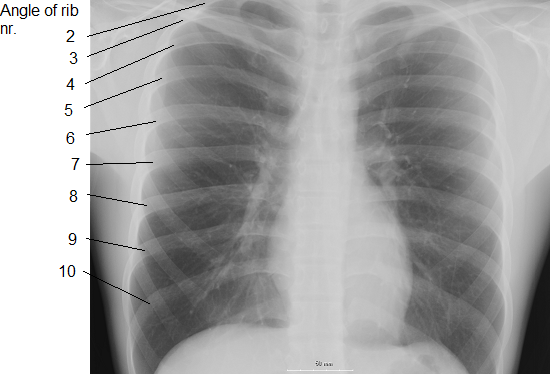
X-ray image of human chest, with ribs labelled

The first seven sets of ribs, known as "true ribs", are attached to the sternum by the costal cartilages. The first rib is unique and easier to distinguish than other ribs. It is a short, flat, C-shaped bone, and attaches to the manubrium. The vertebral attachment can be found just below the neck at the first thoracic vertebra, and the majority of this bone can be found above the level of the clavicle. Ribs 2 through 7 then become longer and less curved as they progress downwards. The following five sets are known as "false ribs", three of these sharing a common cartilaginous connection to the sternum, while the last two (eleventh and twelfth ribs) are termed floating ribs. They are attached to the vertebrae only, and not to the sternum or cartilage coming off of the sternum.

In general, human ribs increase in length from ribs 1 through 7 and decrease in length again through rib 12. Along with this change in size, the ribs become progressively oblique (slanted) from ribs 1 through 9, then less slanted through rib 12.

The rib cage is separated from the lower abdomen by the thoracic diaphragm which controls breathing. When the diaphragm contracts, the thoracic cavity is expanded, reducing intra-thoracic pressure and drawing air into the lungs. This happens through one of two actions (or a mix of the two): when the lower ribs the diaphragm connects to are stabilized by muscles and the central tendon is mobile, when the muscle contracts the central tendon is drawn down, compressing the cavity underneath and expanding the thoracic cavity downward. When the central tendon is stabilized and the lower ribs are mobile, a contraction of the diaphragm elevates the ribs, which works in conjunction with other muscles to expand the thoracic indent upward.

== Development ==
Early in the developing embryo, somites form and soon subdivide into three mesodermal components – the myotome, dermatome, and the sclerotome. The vertebrae and ribs develop from the sclerotomes.

During the fourth week (fertilization age) costal processes have formed on the vertebral bodies. These processes are small, lateral protrusions of mesenchyme that develop in association with the vertebral arches. During the fifth week the costal processes on the thoracic vertebrae become longer to form the ribs. In the sixth week, the costovertebral joints begin to develop and separate the ribs from the vertebrae. The first seven pairs of ribs, the true ribs join at the front to the sternal bars. By the fetal stage the sternal bars have completely fused.

The ribs begin as cartilage that later ossifies – a process called endochondral ossification. Primary ossification centers are located near the angle of each rib, and ossification continues in the direction away from the head and neck. During adolescence secondary ossification centers are formed in the tubercles and heads of the ribs.

== Other animals ==
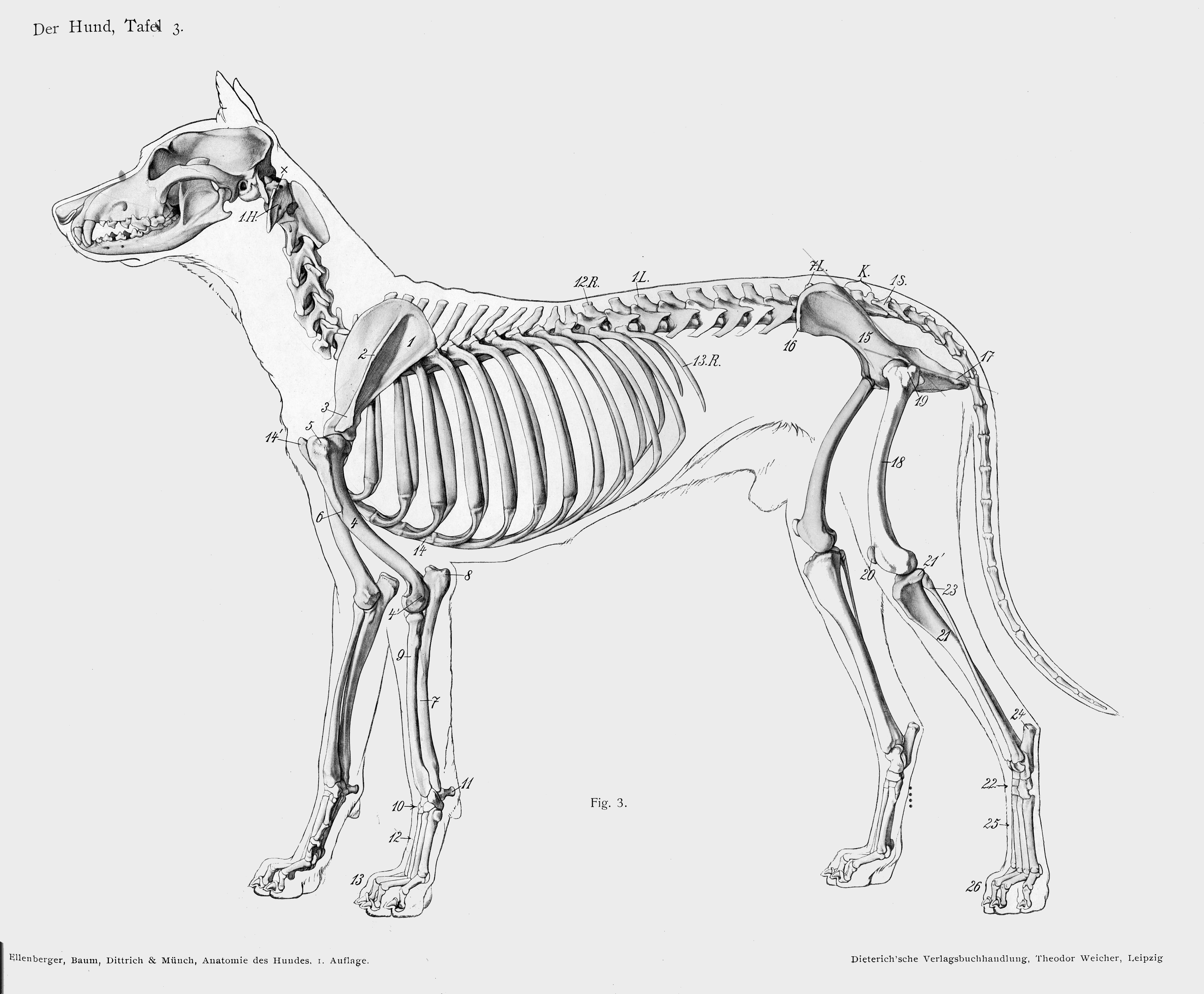
Skeleton of a dog showing the location of the ribs

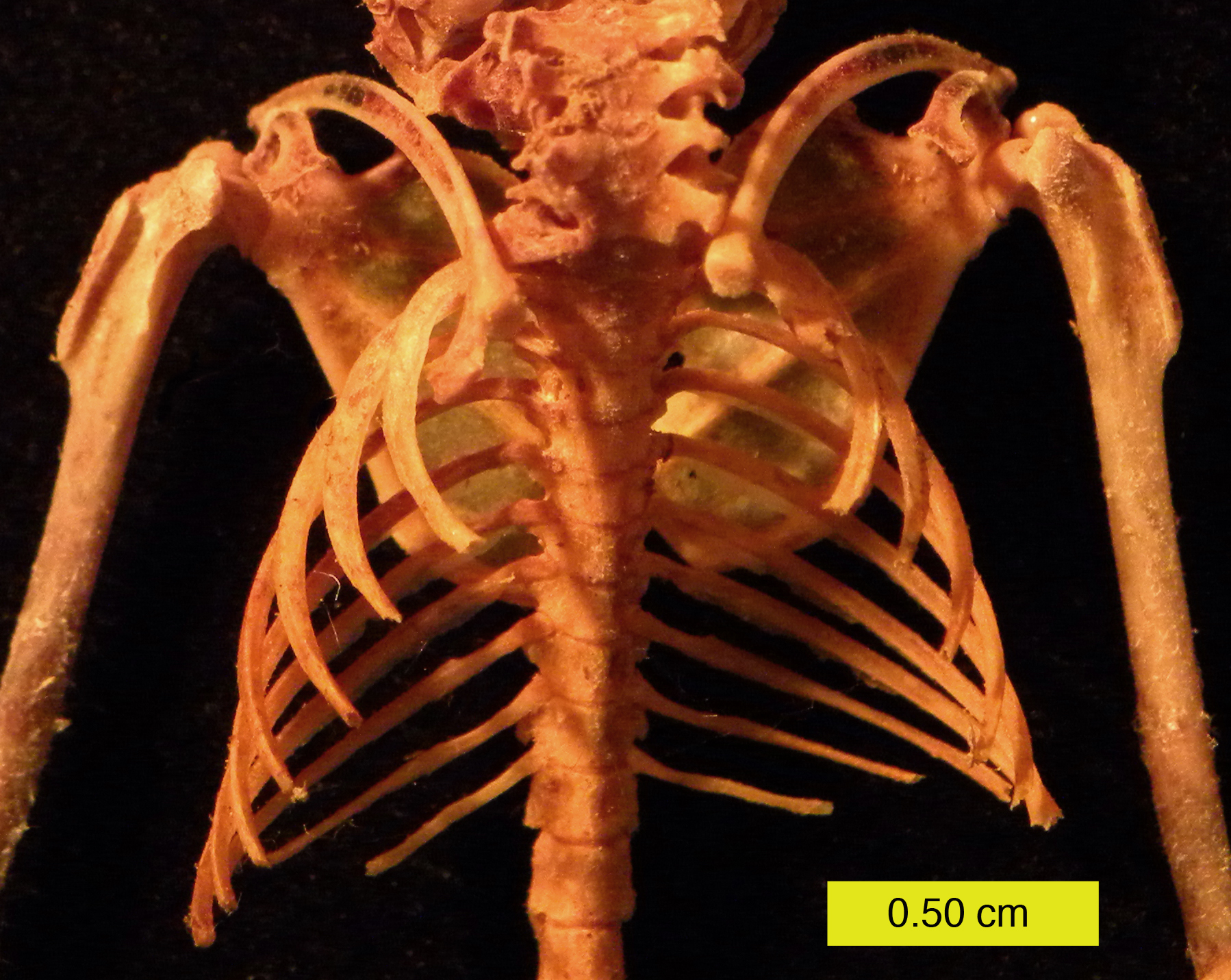
Rib cage of the big brown bat (Eptesicus fuscus)

In jawed fish, there are often two sets of ribs attached to the vertebral column. One set, the dorsal ribs, are found in the dividing septum between the upper and lower parts of the main muscle segments, projecting roughly sideways from the vertebral column. The second set, the ventral ribs arise from the vertebral column just below the dorsal ribs, and enclose the lower body, often joining at the tips. Not all species possess both types of rib, with the dorsal ribs being most commonly absent. Sharks, for example, have no ventral ribs, and only very short dorsal ribs. In some teleosts, there may be additional rib-like bones within the muscle mass.

Tetrapods, however, only ever have a single set of ribs which are probably homologous with the dorsal ribs of fishes. In the earlier choanates, every vertebra bore a pair of ribs, although those on the thoracic vertebrae are typically the longest. The sacral ribs were stout and short, since they formed part of the pelvis, connecting the backbone to the hip bones.

In most true tetrapods, many of these early ribs have been lost, and in living amphibians and reptiles, there is great variation in rib structure and number. For example, turtles have only eight pairs of ribs, which are developed into a bony or cartilaginous carapace and plastron, while snakes have numerous ribs running along the full length of their trunk. Frogs typically have no ribs, aside from a sacral pair, which form part of the pelvis.

In birds, ribs are present as distinct bones only on the thoracic region, although small fused ribs are present on the cervical vertebrae. The thoracic ribs of birds possess a wide projection to the rear; this uncinate process is an attachment for the shoulder muscles. Usually dogs have 26 ribs. Mammals usually also only have distinct ribs on the thoracic vertebra, although fixed cervical ribs are also present in monotremes. In therian mammals, the cervical and lumbar ribs are found only as tiny remnants fused to the vertebrae, where they are referred to as transverse processes. In general, the structure and number of the true ribs in humans is similar to that in other mammals. Unlike reptiles, caudal ribs are never found in mammals.

== Ribs as food ==
Ribs as food are widely used from many animals. The ribs are the less meaty part of the meat chop and they are often cooked as part of a slab; five or more is known as a rack, as in a rack of lamb. Short ribs are ribs of beef either served singly or several as a plate. A rib steak from beef is a popular choice used in many cuisines. Pork ribs, including spare ribs are popular in European and Asian cuisine.

== Animated images ==
Thoracic cage with spine

== See also ==
- Anatomical terms of location
- Bone terminology
- Rib fracture
- Rib removal
