= Ligament of head of rib =

Ligament of head of rib may refer to:

- Intra-articular ligament of head of rib
- Radiate ligament of head of rib
