= Costotransverse joint =

Joint between a rib and the spine

Costotransverse articulations
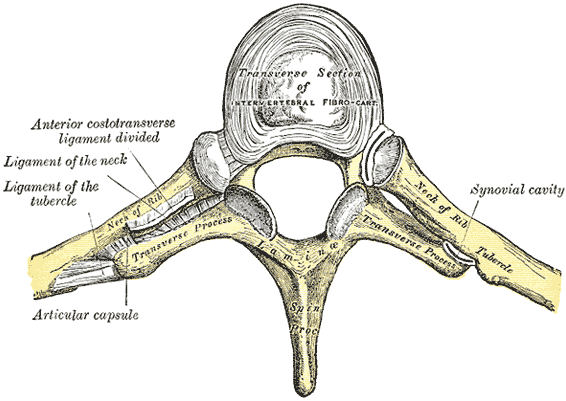
- Costotransverse articulation. Seen from above.

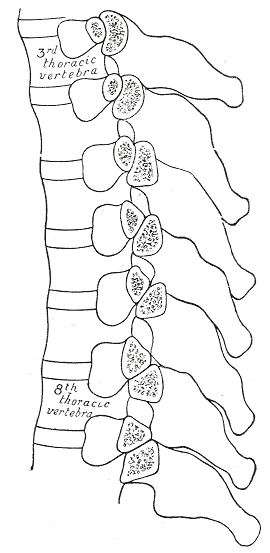
- Section of the costotransverse joints from the third to the ninth inclusive. Contrast the concave facets on the upper with the flattened facets on the lower transverse processes

Details

Identifiers
- Latin: articulatio costotransversaria
- TA98: A03.3.04.005
- TA2: 1724
- FMA: 7952

The costotransverse joint is the joint formed between the facet of the tubercle of the rib and the adjacent transverse process of a thoracic vertebra. The costotransverse joint is a plane type of synovial joint which, under physiological conditions, allows only gliding movement.

This costotransverse joint is present in all but the eleventh and twelfth ribs. The first ten ribs have two joints in close proximity posteriorly; the costovertebral joints and the costotransverse joints. This arrangement restrains the motion of the ribs allowing them to work in a parallel fashion during breathing. If a typical rib had only one joint posteriorly the resultant swivel action would allow a rib to be non-parallel with respect to the neighboring ribs making for a very inefficient breathing.

== Anatomy ==
=== Ligaments ===
The ligaments of the joint are:

- Costotransverse ligament
- Lateral costotransverse ligament
- (Anterior and posterior) superior costotransverse ligament
- Accessory ligament - typically present. It is medial to the superior costotransverse ligament, with the dorsal ramus of a thoracic spinal nerve and associated vessels intervening between the two. Its attachments are variable.

The ligaments limit the movements of the joint to slight gliding.

=== Innervation ===
The intercostal nerves innervate the costotransverse joints. Therefore, therapeutic medial branch blocks are ineffectual.
