= Limbus vertebra =

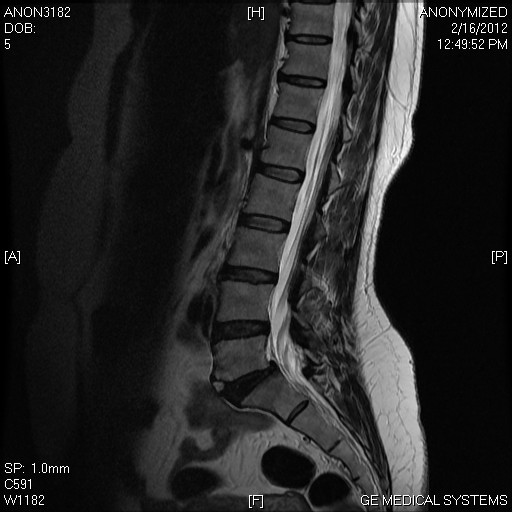
T2 W Sagittal image

A limbus vertebra is a bone tubercle formed by bone trauma on a vertebral body, bearing a radiographic similarity to a vertebral fracture. The anterior-superior corner of a single vertebra is the common site for this defect although it can also be seen at the inferior corner as well as the posterior or anterior margin. Anatomically, it is assumed to be an intra-vertebral body herniation of the disc material occurring during adolescent growth spurt when the ring apophysis has not yet fused. It was first described by Schmorl in 1927 and later in detail by Leif Sward and Adad Baranto.

Viewed in a lateral radiograph, it appears as a triangular shaped bone fragment, not unlike an anterior lip fracture, but with softer edges.

Limbus vertebra is not always symptomatic, but severe cases may lead to more serious pathological conditions and chronic pain. In rare instances, a posterior limbus vertebra has been described causing radiculopathy due to nerve root compression.

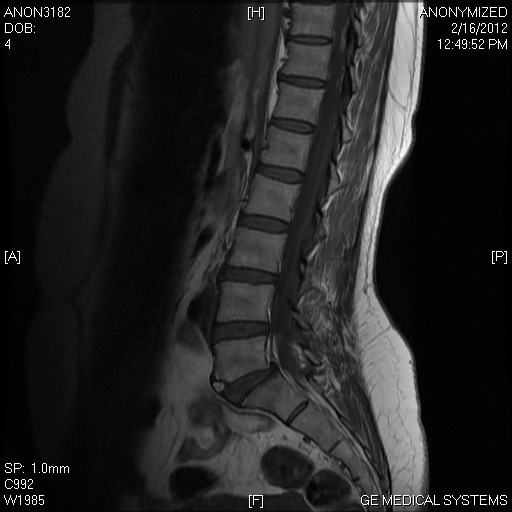
T1 W Sagittal

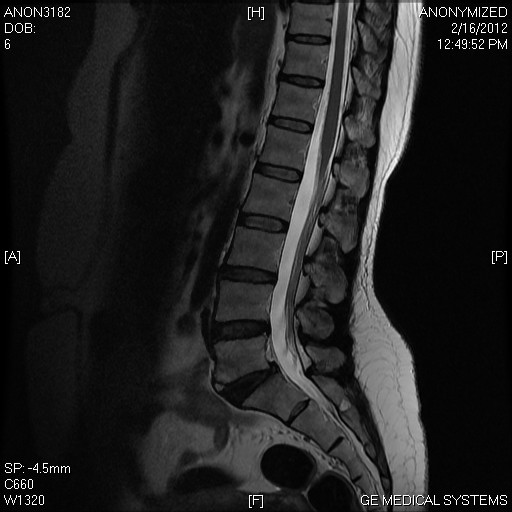
Limbus Vertebra L5
