= Radiate ligament of head of rib =

Ligament of the rib and spine

Radiate ligament
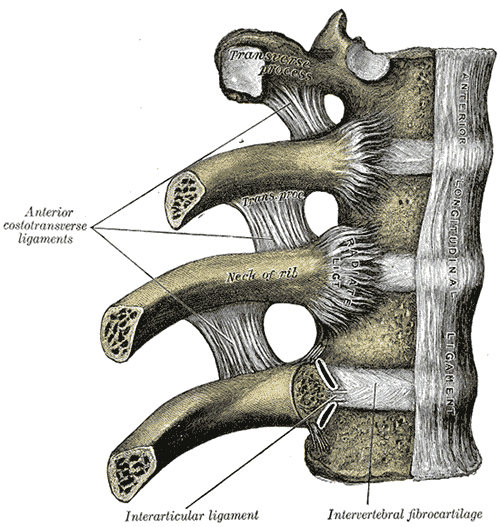
- Costovertebral articulations. Anterior view. (Radiate lig. visible at center.)

Details

Identifiers
- Latin: ligamentum capitis costae radiatum
- TA98: A03.3.04.003
- TA2: 1722
- FMA: 8961

The radiate ligament of head of rib is a ligament of the costovertebral joint that typically connects the anterior edge of the head of each rib, and the side of the bodies of two adjacent vertebrae and their intervertebral discs. The ligament is formed as a thickening of the anterior portion of the joint capsule of the costovertebral joint, and thus reinforces it anteriorly.

== Anatomy ==
In the case of the first rib, the radiate ligament attaches to the bodies of the vertebrae C7 and T1.

In the case of ribs X-XII - each of which articulates with a single vertebra - the radiate ligaments attach onto the corresponding vertebra and the above vertebra.

=== Structure ===
The ligament consists of three bands:

- The superior band extends superior-ward from the rib to the above vertebra.
- The intermediate portion - short and least distinct - extend horizontally from the rib to the IV disc, blending with it. The intermediate band is situated deep to the anterior longitudinal ligament.
- The inferior band extends inferior-ward from the rib to the below verbebra.

=== Relations ===
The radiate ligament is posterior to the thoracic ganglia of the sympathetic trunk, pleura, and - on the right side - the azygos vein; it is anterior to the interarticular ligament, and synovial membranes.
