= Lateral costotransverse ligament =

Ligament of the ribs and spine

Details

Identifiers
- Latin: ligamentum costotransversarium laterale
- TA98: A03.3.04.008
- TA2: 1727
- FMA: 12162

The lateral costotransverse ligament is a short, thick, though ligament of the costotransverse joint which strengthens the joint posteriorly. It connects (the rough, non-articular portion of) the tubercle of a rib, and the transverse process of the corresponding vertebra.

It extends obliquely: at the upper ribs, it is directed inferior-ward from the ribs; at the lower ribs, it is directed superior-ward from the ribs. It is more oblique and shorter at the upper ribs.
