= Superior costotransverse ligament =

Ligament of the rib and spine

Details

Identifiers
- Latin: ligamentum costotransversarium superius
- TA98: A03.3.04.007
- TA2: 1726
- FMA: 8958 8958, 8958

A superior costotransverse ligament is a ligament of the costotransverse joint that attaches onto the crest of the neck of a rib, and onto the transverse process of the vertebra superior to the rib.

The ligament may be subdivided into a strong anterior costotransverse ligament, and a weak posterior costotransverse ligament.

The ligament is absent in the first rib.

== Structure ==
The superior costotransverse ligament is a strong, broad fibrous band.

It comprises two layers:

- The anterior layer attaches at the crest of the neck of rib, and at the inferior aspect of the transverse process of the above vertebra. It extends obliquely superolaterally from the rib to the vertebra. The intercostal nerve and vessels pass across the anterior layer.
- The posterior layer attaches at the posterior aspect of the neck of rib, and (the inferior border of) the transverse process of the above vertebra. It extends superomedially from the rib to the vertebra. It blends laterally with the external intercostal muscle.
