= Costotransverse ligament =

Ligament of the rib and spine

Details
- From: rib
- To: transverse process of a vertebra

Identifiers
- Latin: ligamentum costotransversarium
- TA98: A03.3.04.006
- TA2: 1725
- FMA: 12163

A costotransverse ligament is ligament of the costotransverse joint which attaches at (the posterior aspect of) the neck of a rib, and at (the anterior aspect of) the transverse process of its corresponding vertebra. It extends posteriorly from the rib to the vertebra.

It strengthens the costotransverse joint anteriorly.

It is diminished or absent at the joints of ribs XI-XII.
