= Transverse costal facet =

Thoracic Facet

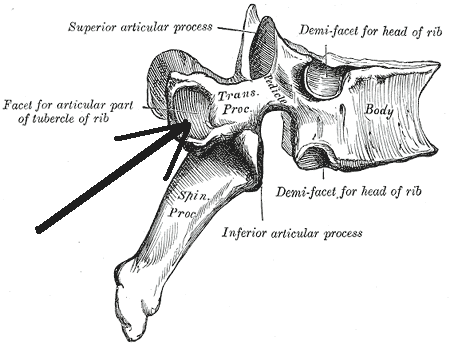
- A thoracic vertebra.

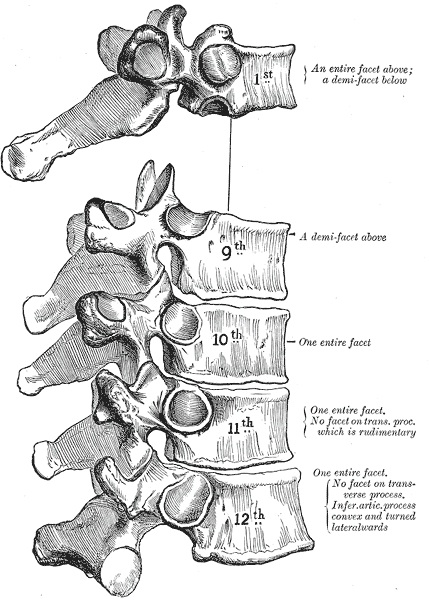
- Peculiar thoracic vertebræ.

Details

Identifiers
- Latin: fovea costalis transversalis
- TA98: A02.2.03.004
- TA2: 1062
- FMA: 10440

The transverse costal facet (or transverse costal fovea) is one of the costal facets, a site where a rib forms a joint with the transverse process of a thoracic vertebra.
