= Superior costal facet =

Part of a rib

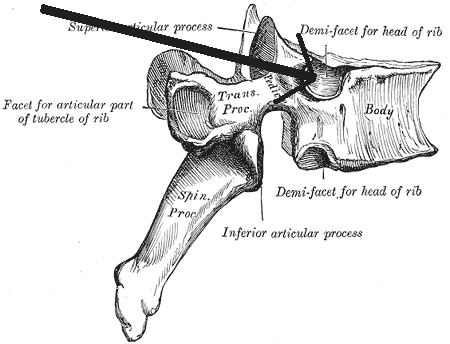
- A thoracic vertebra.

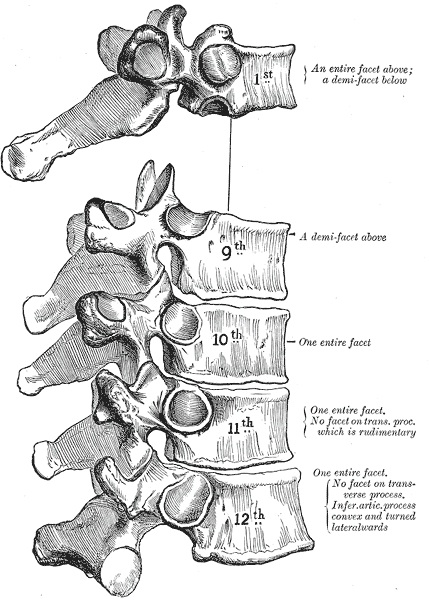
- Peculiar thoracic vertebræ.

Details

Identifiers
- Latin: fovea costalis superior
- TA98: A02.2.03.002
- TA2: 1060
- FMA: 9145

The superior costal facet (or superior costal fovea) is a site where a rib forms a joint with the top of a vertebra.

Ribs connect to the thoracic vertebrae at two main points, the inferior and superior costal facets. These connection points are located on two different vertebrae that are located on top of one another. The superior costal facet is located on the inferior thoracic vertebrae. The inferior costal facet is located on the superior vertebrae. While these terms may be confusing, it helps to know that the costal facets are named for their position on the vertebral body itself, not for the part of the rib that they articulate with. Costal facets only apply to ribs 2–9. Ribs 1, 10, 11, and 12 articulate completely onto the thoracic vertebrae rather than in between two of them.
