= Plane joint =

Joint in the body

Gliding joint
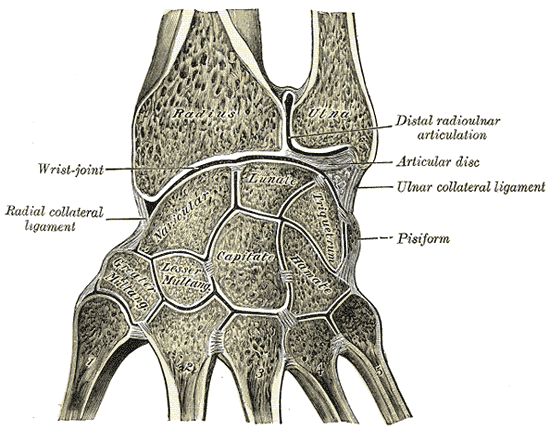
- Vertical section through the articulations at the wrist, showing the synovial cavities.

Details

Identifiers
- Latin: articulatio plana
- TA98: A03.0.00.043
- TA2: 1555
- FMA: 75293

A plane joint (arthrodial joint, gliding joint, plane articulation) is a synovial joint which, under physiological conditions, allows only gliding movement.

Plane joints permit sliding movements in the plane of articular surfaces. The opposed surfaces of the bones are flat or almost flat, with movement limited by their tight joint capsules. Based only on their shape, plane joints can allow multiple movements, including rotation. Thus plane joints can be functionally classified as multiaxial joints. Plane joints are numerous and are nearly always small, such as the acromioclavicular joint between the acromion of the scapula and the clavicle. Typically, they are found in the wrists, ankles, the 2nd through 7th sternocostal joints, vertebral transverse and spinous processes.
