= Intra-articular ligament of head of rib =

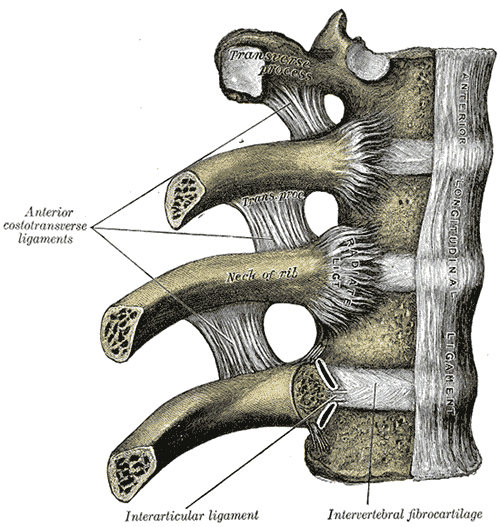
- Costovertebral articulations. Anterior view. (Intra-articular ligament of head of rib labeled at bottom left).

Details

Identifiers
- Latin: ligamentum intraarticulare capitis costae, ligamentum capitis costae intraarticulare
- TA98: A03.3.04.004
- TA2: 1723
- FMA: 8962

The intra-articular ligament of head of rib is a ligament of the articulation of head of rib situated within the joint capsule. It takes the shape of a short, flat band. It joins the crest of head of rib (between the superior costal articular facet and inferior costal articular facet - thus dividing the joint cavity into two compartments), and the intervertebral disc. It is absent in ribs I and X-XII.
