= Costovertebral joints =

Joints of the rib and spine

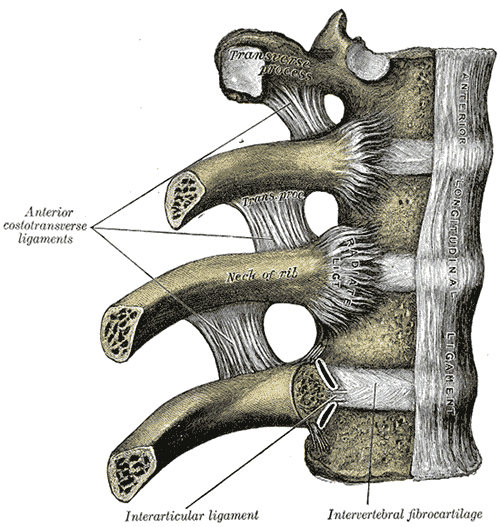
- Costovertebral joints, seen from front, intra-articular ligament labeled at lower left

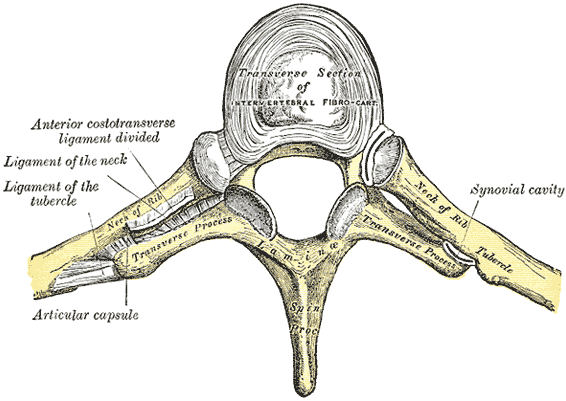
- Costotransverse joint, seen from above

Details

Identifiers
- Latin: articulationes costovertebrales
- TA98: A03.3.04.001
- TA2: 1720
- FMA: 71375

The costovertebral joints are the joints that connect the ribs to the vertebral column.

- The articulation of the head of rib connects the head of the rib and the bodies of vertebrae.
- The costotransverse joint connects the rib with the transverse processes of vertebrae.
