= Inferior costal facet =

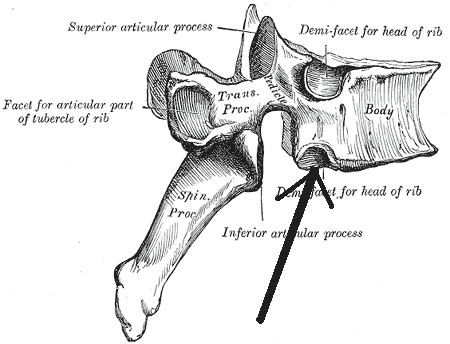
- A thoracic vertebra.

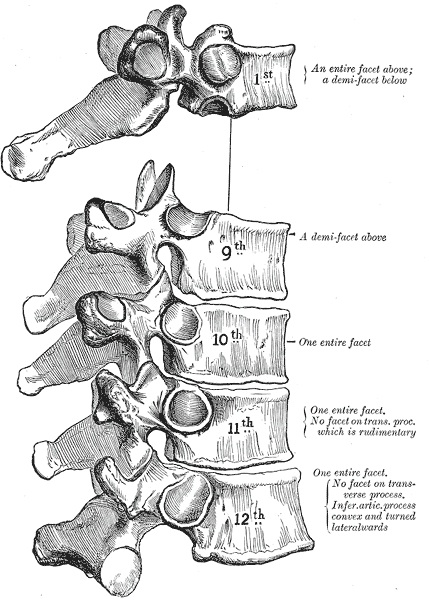
- Peculiar thoracic vertebræ.

Details

Identifiers
- Latin: fovea costalis inferior
- TA98: A02.2.03.003
- TA2: 1061
- FMA: 9146

The inferior costal facet (or inferior costal fovea) is a site where a rib forms a joint with the inferior aspect of the body of a thoracic vertebra.

In the adjacent picture, the arrow points to an inferior costal facet. The facets are named for their location on the vertebral body, not the rib. The inferior costal facet is located on the inferior aspect of the vertebral body, but has a superior location on the rib. Similarly, the superior costal facet is superior on the vertebral body but is inferior on the rib.
