= Head tilt/Chin lift =

Procedure to prevent the tongue obstructing the upper airway

- The head-tilt/chin-lift is the most reliable method of opening the airway
- MeSH: D058109

The head-tilt/chin-lift is a procedure used to prevent the tongue obstructing the upper airways. The maneuver is performed by tilting the head backwards in unconscious patients, often by applying pressure to the forehead and the chin. The maneuver is used on any patient where cervical spine injury is not a concern and is taught on most first aid courses as the standard way of clearing an airway. This maneuver and the jaw-thrust maneuver are two of the main tools of basic airway management.

If cervical spine injury is a concern and/or the patient is immobilized on a long spine board and/or with a cervical collar; the jaw-thrust maneuver can be used instead.

If the patient is in danger of aspirating; they should be placed in the recovery position or advanced airway management should be used.

== See also ==
- Airway management
- Cardiopulmonary resuscitation
- First aid
