= Jaw-thrust maneuver =

Airway management procedure

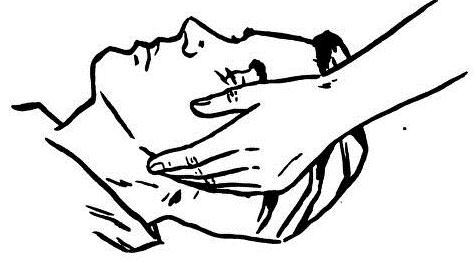
- The Jaw-thrust maneuver is a method used for opening the airway in unconscious patients
- MeSH: D058109

The jaw-thrust maneuver is a first aid and medical procedure used to prevent the tongue from obstructing the upper airways. This maneuver and the head-tilt/chin-lift maneuver are two of the main tools of basic airway management, and they are often used in conjunction with other basic airway techniques including bag-valve-mask ventilation. The jaw-thrust maneuver is often used on patients with cervical neck problems or suspected cervical spine injury.

The maneuver is used on a supine patient. It is performed by placing the index and middle fingers to physically push the posterior aspects of the lower jaw upwards while their thumbs push down on the chin to open the mouth. When the mandible is displaced forward, it pulls the tongue forward and prevents it from obstructing the entrance to the trachea.

Traditionally, the jaw-thrust maneuver has been considered the better alternative (rather than the head-tilt/chin-lift maneuver) when a first aider suspects that the patient may have a spinal injury (especially one to the neck portion of the spine). The International Liaison Committee on Resuscitation has reviewed various studies that found no spine-protecting advantage to the jaw-thrust maneuver. Its "Treatment Recommendation" under "Opening the Airway" says, "Rescuers should open the airway using the head tilt–chin lift maneuver." If the patient is in danger of pulmonary aspiration, he or she should be placed in the recovery position, or advanced airway management should be used.

== See also ==
- Airway management
- First aid
