= Advanced airway management =

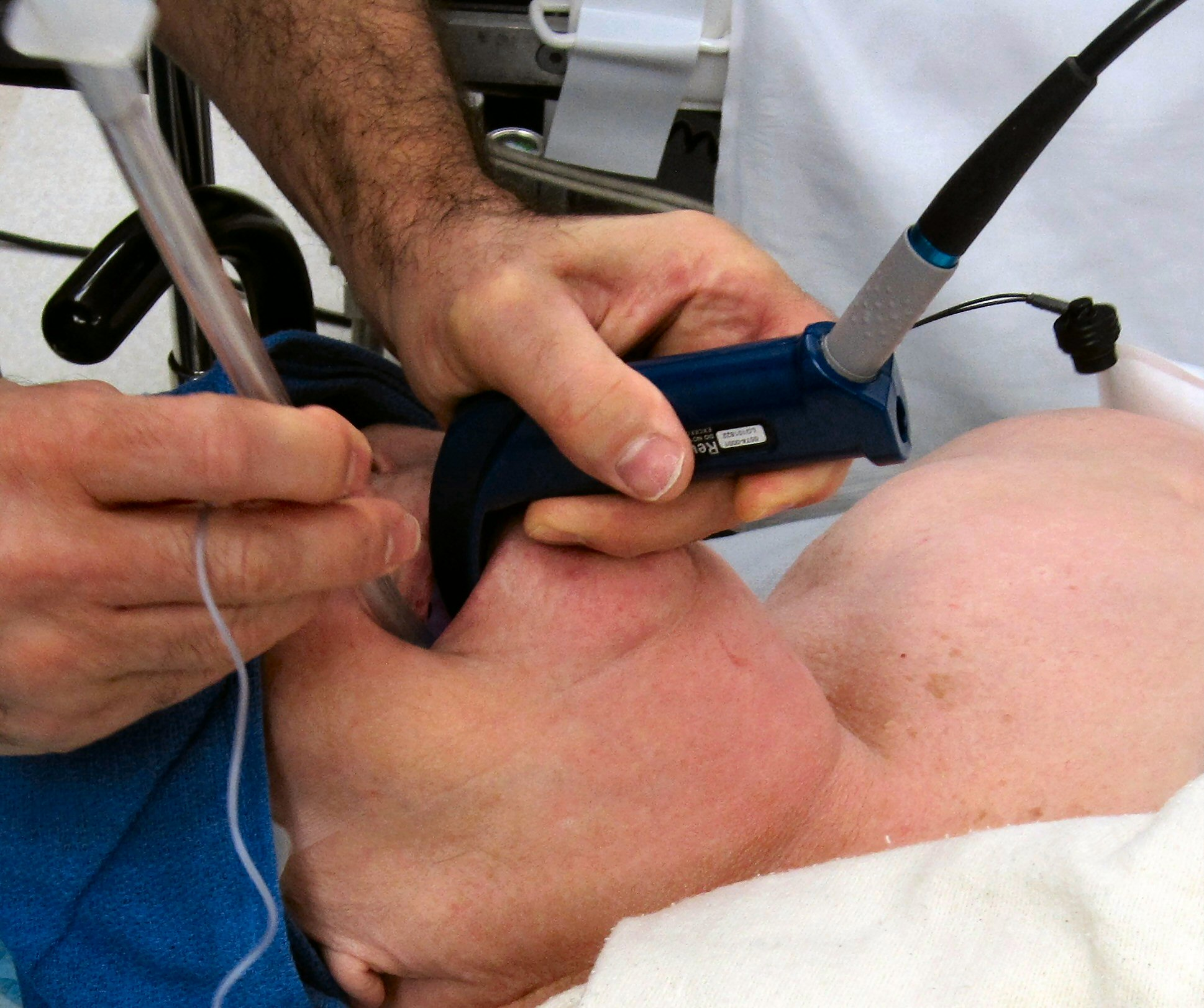
- An anesthesiologist using a video laryngoscope to intubate a patient with challenging airway anatomy

Advanced airway management is the subset of airway management that involves advanced training, skill, and invasiveness. It encompasses various techniques performed to create an open or patent airway – a clear path between a patient's lungs and the outside world. These techniques are used when a patient is unable to maintain airway patency, protect the airway from aspiration, or achieve adequate oxygenation and ventilation on their own.

This is accomplished by clearing or preventing obstructions of airways. There are multiple causes of potential airway obstructions, including the patient's own tongue or other anatomical components of the airway, foreign bodies, excessive amounts of blood and body fluids, or aspiration of food particles.

Unlike basic airway management, such as the head tilt/chin lift or jaw-thrust maneuver, advanced airway management relies on the use of medical equipment and advanced training in anesthesiology, emergency medicine, or critical care medicine. Certain invasive airway management techniques can be performed with visualization of the glottis or "blind" – without direct visualization of the glottis. Visualization of the glottis can be accomplished either directly by using a laryngoscope blade or by utilizing newer video technology options.

Supraglottic airways in increasing order of invasiveness are nasopharyngeal (NPA), oropharyngeal (OPA), and laryngeal mask airways (LMA). Laryngeal mask airways can even be used to deliver general anesthesia or intubate a patient through the device. These are followed by infraglottic techniques, such as tracheal intubation and finally surgical techniques.

Advanced airway management is a key component in cardiopulmonary resuscitation, anesthesia, emergency medicine, and intensive care medicine. Within Advanced Cardiac Life Support (ACLS) algorithms, advanced airway placement may be considered to optimize oxygenation and ventilation while minimizing interruptions in chest compressions. The "A" in the ABC mnemonic for dealing with critically ill patients stands for airway management. Many airways are straightforward to manage. However, some can be challenging. Such difficulties can be predicted to some extent by a physical exam. Common methods of assessing difficult airways include a Mallampati score, Cormack-Lehane classification, thyromental distance, degree of mouth opening, neck range of motion, body habitus, and malocclusion (underbite or overbite). A recent Cochrane systematic review examines the sensitivity and specificity of the various bedside tests commonly used to predict difficulty in airway management.

== Equipment ==
Airway adjuncts are medical tools used to maintain an open airway in a conscious or unconscious patient. These include:

- Oropharyngeal airway adjuncts (OPA) are curved hard plastic adjuncts that are inserted with the curve facing towards the tongue. They are then flipped by the operator so that the curve is against the roof of the patients mouth. This maneuver forces the jaw open and assists in keeping the upper airway open.
- Nasopharyngeal airway adjuncts (NPA) are soft rubber tubes with a coned end and a tapered end. In certain prehospital settings the adjunct is measured from the nose to the earlobe and is then lubricated and inserted tapered end first into the nose of the patient. the NPA is used in instances where the integrity of the roof of the mouth is compromised, with infants or if the patient has an intact gag reflex.
- Endotracheal tube(ET) is an advanced adjunct that is inserted through the nose or mouth. It is thought to be the most difficult adjunct to install but it is also the most secure adjunct available in the prehospital setting. ET tubes work by being inserted into the trachea, where the operator then inflates a small balloon which keeps the trachea patent. This device can be connected to pressurized supplemental oxygen.
- Laryngeal mask airway(LM)
- Laryngeal tube(LT)
- Esophageal-tracheal tube

== Pharyngeal airways ==
Pharyngeal airway devices are used in spontaneously breathing patients to move the tongue away from the back of the throat to restore airway patency. Obstruction of the upper airway caused by the tongue most commonly occurs during decreased levels of consciousness. Pharyngeal airway devices include oropharyngeal airways (OPAs) and nasopharyngeal airways (NPAs). These devices are the simplest artificial airways.

=== Oropharyngeal airways ===
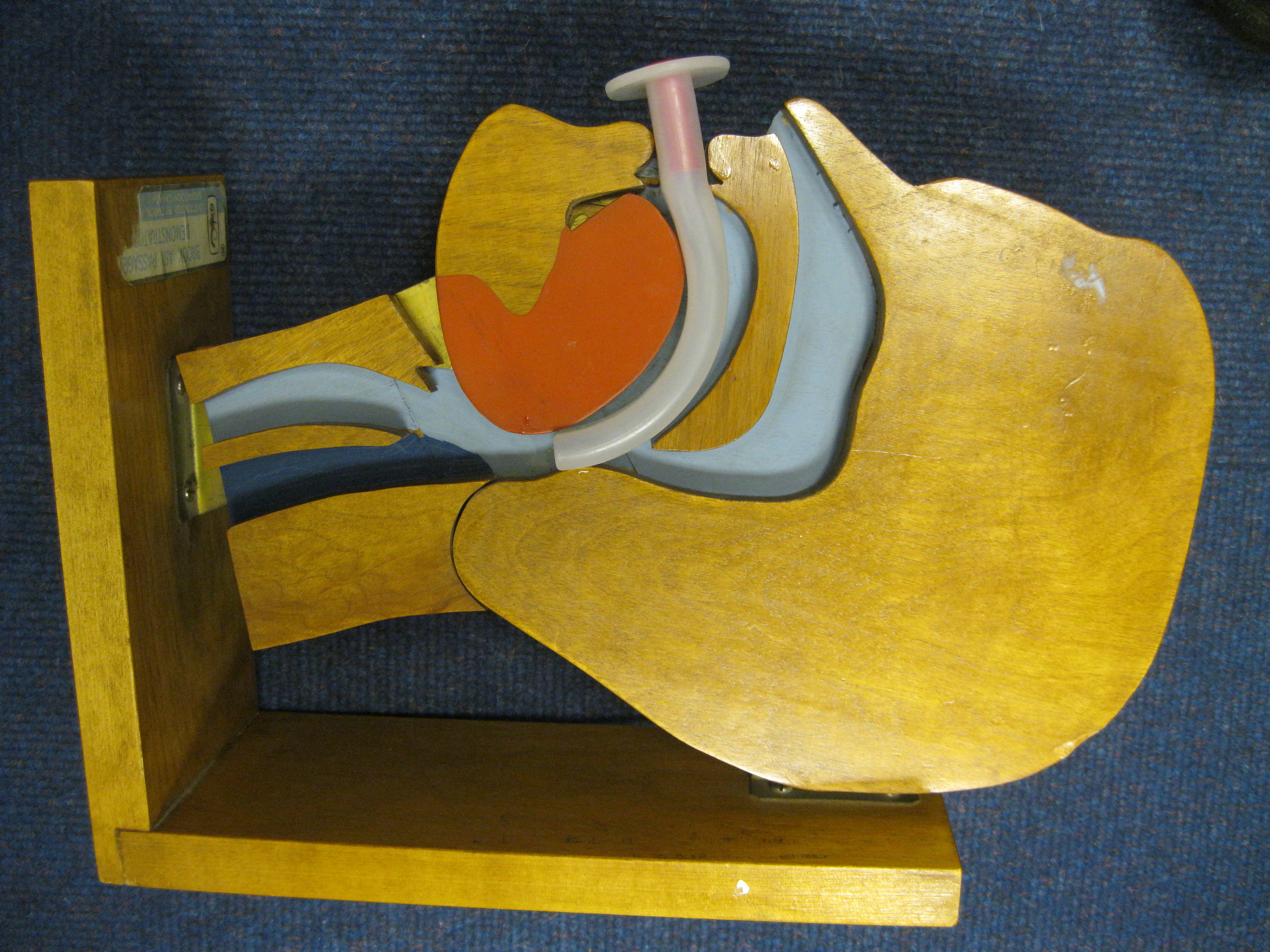
A model of an oropharyngeal airway (OPA) preventing the tongue from obstructing the airway

An oropharyngeal airway (OPA) is a rigid tube that is inserted into the mouth through the oropharynx and placed above the tongue to move it away from the back of the throat. They are more commonly used than nasopharyngeal airways (NPAs). OPAs should only be used in profoundly unresponsive or unconscious patients without a gag reflex. Placement of the device may stimulate the gag reflex and cause vomiting, aspiration, and laryngospasm. Complications from OPA placement include damage to the teeth and the lingual nerve, which may cause changes in taste and sensation of the tongue.

=== Nasopharyngeal airways ===
A nasopharyngeal airway (NPA) is a flexible tube that is passed through the nose into the back of the throat. They are the artificial airways of choice in patients who are conscious and have intact gag reflexes because they are less likely to stimulate the gag reflex than oropharyngeal airways (OPAs). NPAs can also be used in other situations where OPAs cannot, such as in patients with restricted mouth opening or oral trauma. NPAs are generally not recommended if there is suspicion of a fracture to the base of the skull due to the risk of the tube entering the skull. They are also contraindicated in the presence of significant facial trauma. Nosebleeds are a complication of NPAs that may result from the use of excessive force or a lack of lubrication during placement.

== Extraglottic airways ==
Extraglottic airway devices (EGDs) create a patent airway without entering the trachea. These devices are highly effective for providing oxygenation and ventilation. They can be used as primary airway devices, such as during CPR, or as rescue devices in situations where securing an airway using other devices has failed. EGDs are especially effective rescue devices for obese patients and patients with significant facial trauma. EGDs do not protect the trachea from obstruction or aspiration. They may be used for several hours until a definitive airway can be secured.

Each type of EGD has different features, including the ability to remove air from the stomach (gastric decompression) and perform tracheal intubation. All EGDs can be placed without directly seeing the glottis (also called "blind" placement). EGDs can be classified into supraglottic airways and retroglottic airways.

=== Supraglottic airways ===
Supraglottic airway devices (SGAs) create a seal over the glottic opening to route oxygen directly into the trachea. The SGAs consist entirely of laryngeal masks. Several manufacturers produce these devices, the most well known being the laryngeal mask airway (LMA). Success rates of SGAs in securing airways are similar between the different models, and these devices provide effective ventilation in more than 98% of patients. SGAs can be placed in under 30 seconds, making them advantageous for emergency use. Serious complications are rare and usually result from nerve and soft tissue trauma in the pharynx during placement.

=== Retroglottic airways ===
Retroglottic airway devices (RGAs) pass behind the glottis and into the esophagus to create a seal allowing oxygen to be delivered directly to the trachea. The RGAs are designed as laryngeal tubes. Examples of RGAs include the Combitube and the King LT. Studies comparing the effectiveness between the RGAs are lacking. Like SGAs, most complications from RGAs result from trauma to the pharynx during placement.

== Tracheal intubation ==
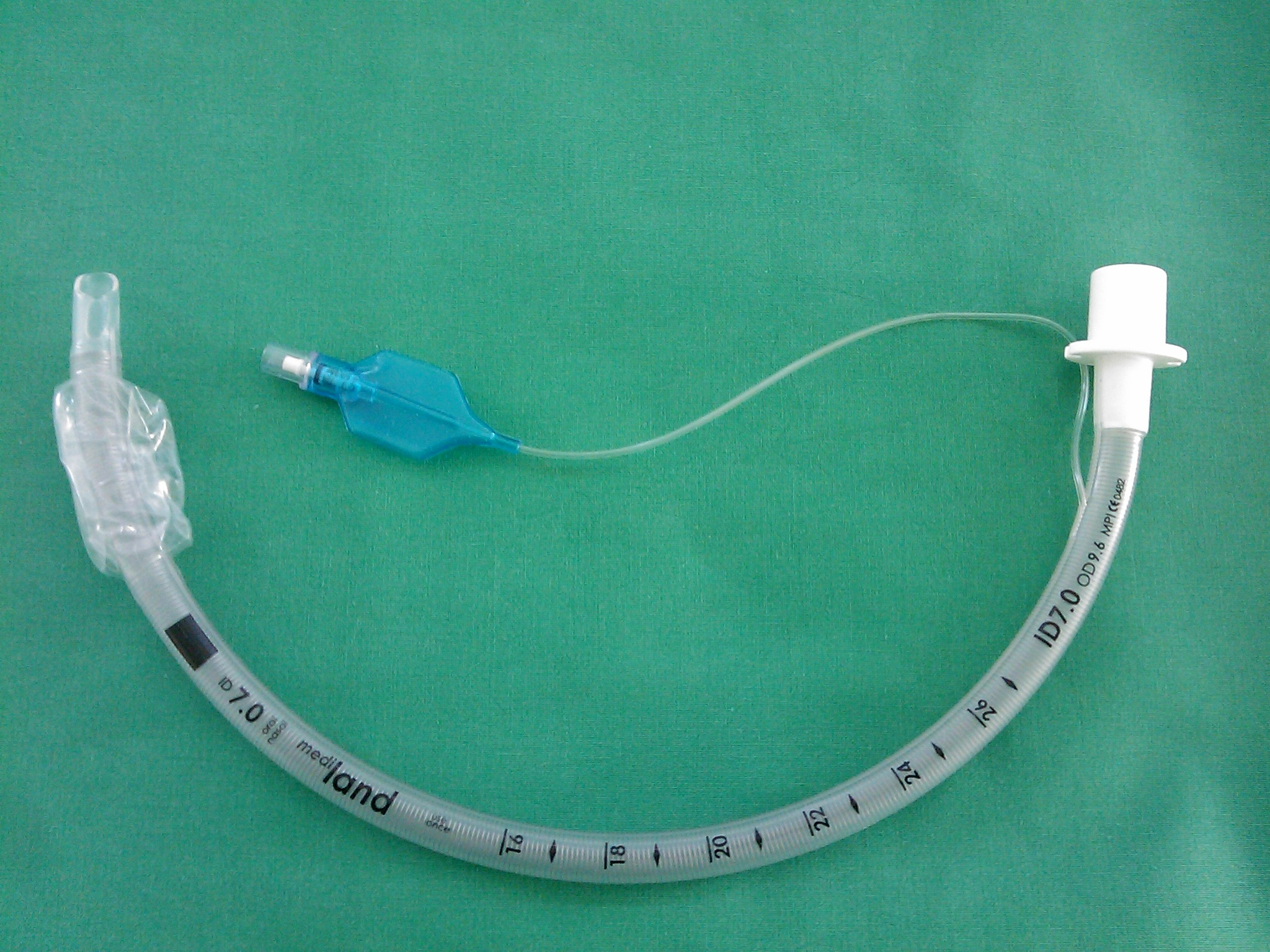
A cuffed endotracheal tube used in tracheal intubation

Tracheal intubation, often simply referred to as intubation, is the placement of a flexible plastic or rubber endotracheal tube (ETT) into the trachea to maintain an open airway, allow for effective ventilation, protect the airway from aspiration (when a cuffed ETT is used), and to serve as a conduit through which to administer inhaled anesthetics. It is frequently performed in surgery, critically injured, ill or anesthetized patients to facilitate ventilation of the lungs, including mechanical ventilation, and to prevent the possibility of asphyxiation or airway obstruction. The most widely used route is orotracheal intubation, in which an endotracheal tube is passed through the mouth, through the vocal cords, and into the trachea. In a nasotracheal intubation, a nasotracheal tube (NTT) is passed through the nose, through the vocal cords, and into the trachea.

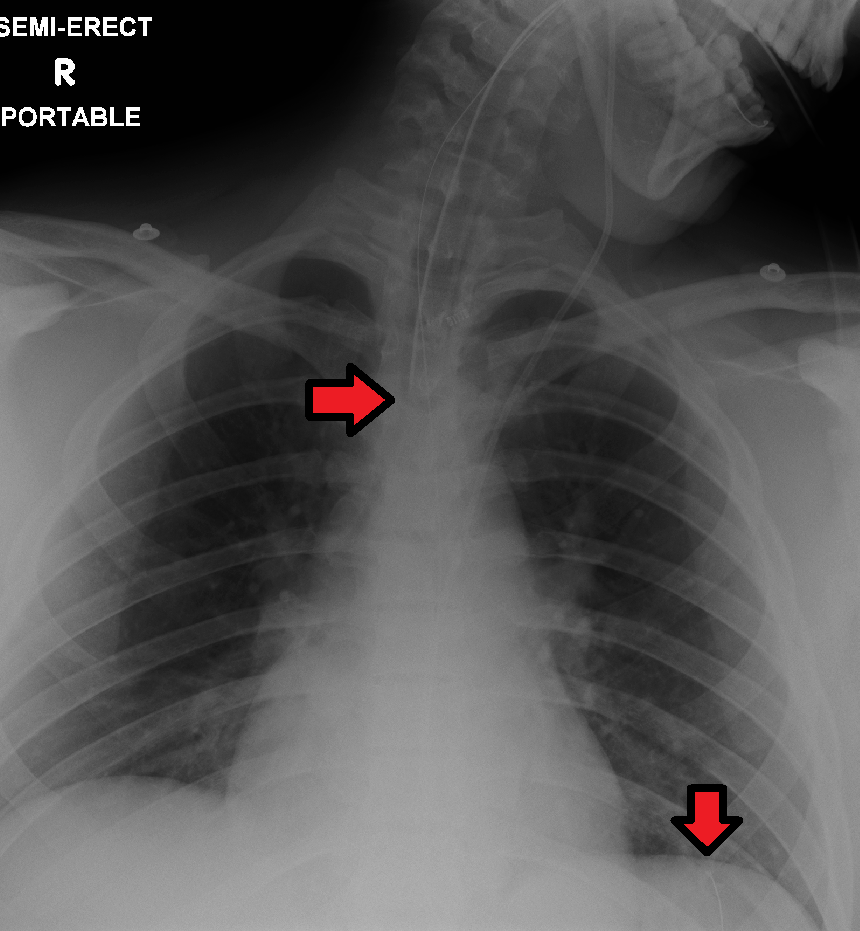
Top Arrow: Endotracheal tube Bottom Arrow: Nasogastric tube

=== Indications ===
There are specific indications or guidelines for deciding a more invasive and more secure airway is worth the associated risk:

- respiratory failure
- apnea or the suspension of breathing
- decreased or altered level of consciousness, rapid mental status change, Glasgow Coma Scale score less than 8 (GCS<8).
- major trauma, such as penetrating injury to the abdomen or chest
- direct airway injury or facial burns
- high risk of aspiration

=== Methods ===
==== Direct Laryngoscopy ====
Classically, tracheal intubation has been performed utilizing direct laryngoscopy to obtain direct visualization of the vocal cords. There are multiple different laryngoscope blade styles, shapes, and lengths from which to choose based on patient anatomy and clinician preference. In North America, the Macintosh blade is the most commonly used curved blade while the Miller blade is the most common straight blade. Many modern laryngoscopes are equipped with a fiberoptic light source to aid in visualization. Regardless of blade shape, direct laryngoscopy technique involves passage of the laryngoscope through the mouth and into the back of the throat. Manipulation of the neck and lifting of the tongue allows for direct visualization of the larynx and vocal cords by the operator. Following visualization, the endotracheal tube can be passed along the blade, through the vocal cords, and into the trachea. Adjuncts such as a bougie (tracheal introducer) or stylet may be used to assist with endotracheal tube placement, particularly in cases where visualization of the vocal cords is limited. A bougie can be advanced into the trachea first, with the endotracheal tube subsequently railroaded over it.

Rapid Sequence Induction (RSI)

Rapid sequence induction (RSI) is a technique used to facilitate tracheal intubation in patients at high risk of aspiration or with respiratory failure. RSI involves the administration of a rapid-acting sedative (induction agent) followed immediately by a neuromuscular blocking agent to induce unconsciousness and paralysis, allowing prompt placement of an endotracheal tube while minimizing the risk of gastric aspiration. Bag-mask ventilation is often limited prior to intubation to reduce gastric insufflation. RSI is commonly performed in emergency medicine, critical care, and trauma settings.

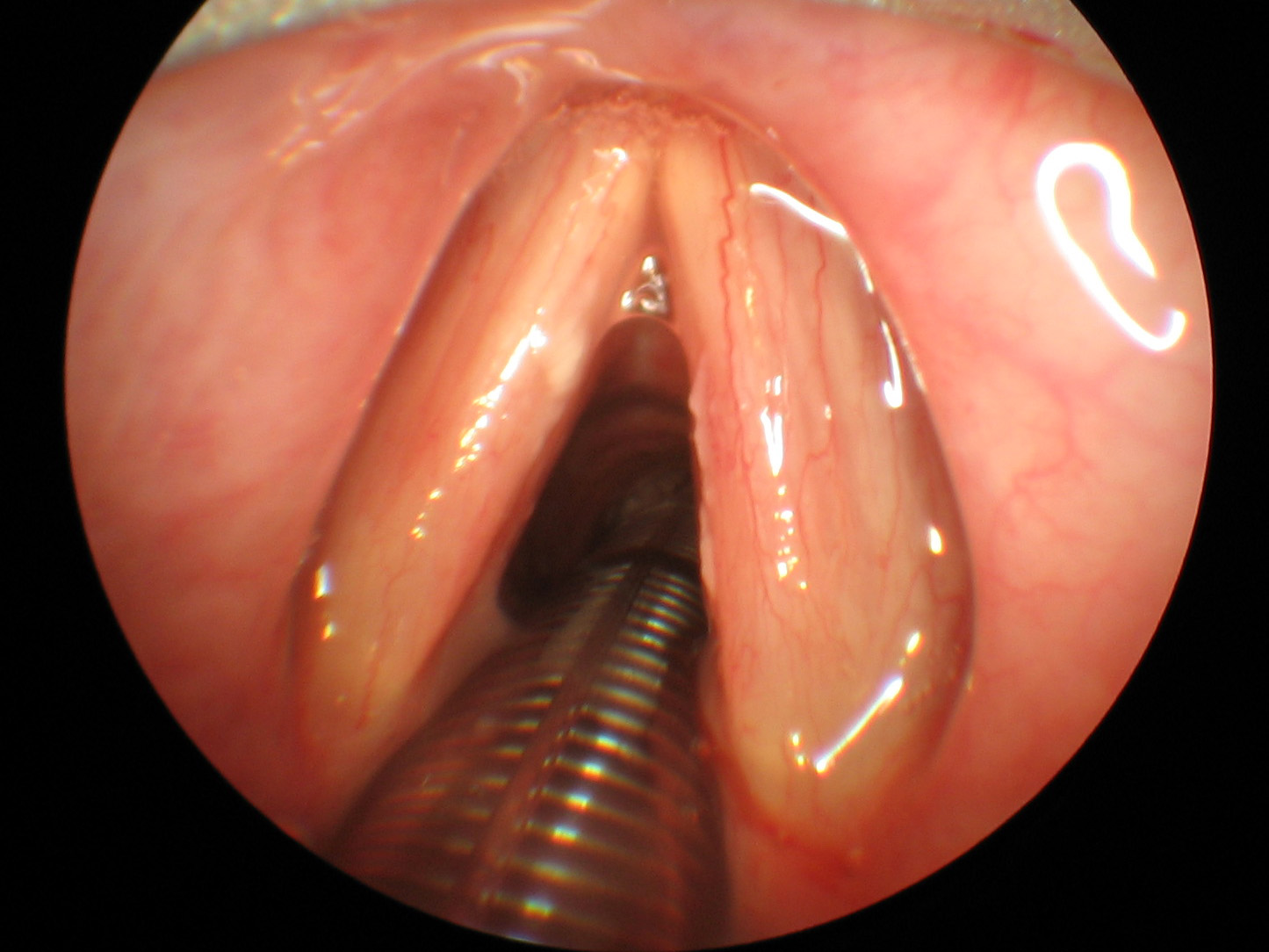
A video laryngoscope image depicting successful intubation with the endotracheal tube successfully placed between the vocal cords

==== Video Laryngoscopy ====
Multiple intubation tools are now available with built-in video technology, also known as video laryngoscopy. The GlideScope model utilizes a curved laryngoscopic blade with an integrated camera connected to a large external monitor. The McGrath model has a compact design with a small display directly attached to the laryngoscopic blade. The operator introduces the video laryngoscope through the mouth with a technique similar to direct laryngoscopy. The larynx and vocal cords are visualized via the camera and the operator is able to pass the endotracheal tube through the vocal cords and into the trachea under direct visualization on the video monitor. Studies have shown that when compared to direct laryngoscopy, video laryngoscopy resulted in fewer failed intubation attempts, especially in patients with known difficult airways. Limitations of video laryngoscopy exist and prevent the exclusive use of this method over direct laryngoscopy. Excessive blood and saliva in the airway can cover the camera lens on the video laryngoscope and obscure effective visualization of the anatomy, preventing effective intubation attempts. This is of importance in patients with trauma to their airway, increasing the amount of blood present, and patients taking sialogogues, or drugs that increase the flow of saliva.

==== Fiberoptic Intubation ====
In patients with known difficult airways, fiberoptic intubation can be considered. This technique involves the use of a flexible fiberoptic bronchoscope for visualization of the vocal cords. The bronchoscope can be passed directly into the trachea and the endotracheal tube can be threaded over the bronchoscope into position. This technique has various advantages over direct laryngoscopy and video laryngoscopy techniques. The fiberoptic scope is flexible and can be directed by the operator, allowing it to traverse the upper airway with minimal manipulation of the patient's neck. The operator can manipulate the device around obstructions in the upper airway, making the technique advantageous for patients with cancer or swelling in the upper airway. The device is relatively small compared to a laryngoscope and can therefore be implemented in patients with small mouth openings. Additionally, the fiberoptic scope can be passed through the nostril to provide visualization for a nasotracheal intubation. Lastly, fiberoptic intubation can be conducted in an awake patient with sufficient use of local anesthetics, which can prove useful in patients who would otherwise be unable to be anesthetized without having a secure airway in place beforehand.

==== Less Common Methods ====
There are a variety of less commonly used methods of intubation and ventilating a patient, which even includes methods avoiding tracheal intubation. Some of the more popular techniques include Lightwand intubation that uses an LED lit stylet to transilluminate the soft tissues of the neck if correctly placed in the trachea and then inserting an endotracheal tube through it. The Lightwand was originally developed for use in the military where a blood in the airway may obstruct an effective view of the glottis.

Utilization of transtracheal jet ventilation is often used independently in cases where an endotracheal tube may be obstruct the surgeon from working in the oral cavity or airway (i.e. maxillofacial surgery or ear, nose, and throat [ENT] surgery). The process entails low tidal volume and high-frequency ventilation via a laryngeal catheter to ventilate a patient. It can be utilized when a difficult airway is anticipated but it is not recommended to be used as a part of the difficult airway algorithm when a patient cannot be otherwise intubated or ventilated.

=== Confirming placement ===
It is necessary to confirm placement of the endotracheal tube to ensure that the tube is properly positioned within the trachea and has not accidentally passed into the esophagus instead. Additionally, it is important to confirm that the endotracheal tube was not placed too deep in the trachea where is may only be ventilating one of the lungs due to it being positioned within a mainstem bronchi (frequently the right mainstem bronchi due to a more obtuse angle than the left). The gold standard for confirming successful placement of an endotracheal tube is direct visualization of the tube passing through the vocal cords and continuous positive waveform end-tidal carbon dioxide on capnography. Secondary methods of confirmation include oxygen saturation, chest x-ray, ultrasound, condensation in the endotracheal tube, equal chest rise, breath sounds heard on both sides of the chest (often with the assistance of a large tidal volume breath), and an absence of breath sounds over the epigastrium. No single method of confirming placement is 100% reliable so multiple methods of confirmation should be utilized.

== Surgical airways ==
In cricothyrotomy, the incision or puncture is made through the cricothyroid membrane in between the thyroid cartilage and the cricoid cartilage

Surgical methods for airway management rely on making a surgical incision below the glottis in order to achieve direct access to the lower respiratory tract, bypassing the upper respiratory tract. Surgical airway management is performed as a last resort in cases where tracheal intubation has failed, is not feasible, or is contraindicated. Surgical methods for airway management include cricothyrotomy and tracheotomy.

=== Cricothyrotomy ===
A cricothyrotomy is a procedure during which an incision is made through the cricothyroid membrane, allowing an artificial airway to be placed in the trachea. It is the first-line surgical procedure to access an airway in an emergency because it can be performed more quickly than a tracheotomy and is less likely to cause bleeding and damage to thyroid tissue. A cricothyrotomy creates a temporary airway that can be used until a more definitive airway can be secured. A cricothyrotomy is typically performed as an emergency procedure when other airway management attempts have failed and the patient is at risk of asphyxiation. The most common acute complications are bleeding, tracheal cartilage laceration, tracheal perforation, infection, subglottic stenosis, and voice changes. The procedure is frequently performed by an otorhinolaryngologist (an ear, nose, and throat surgeon) if available or an anesthesiologist.

=== Tracheotomy ===
A tracheotomy is a surgical procedure creating an incision in the front of the neck down to the trachea. A tracheostomy tube can be placed through the opening created by the incision, which allows breathing through the tube rather than the nose and mouth. Although the terms are sometimes used interchangeably, a "tracheotomy" is the surgical procedure creating an incision into the trachea, while "tracheostomy" refers to the opening in the trachea created by the incision. The most common acute complications of a tracheotomy are difficulty speaking or swallowing due to nerve damage, prolonged bleeding at the incision site, and pneumothorax. A tracheotomy is rarely indicated in an emergent setting. It more commonly performed in a controlled environment to create an airway that can be used long-term, such as for prolonged mechanical ventilation.

== Difficult airway algorithm ==
Various expert societies in airway management, including the American Society of Anesthesiologists, have recommended approaches to difficult airways. The algorithm provides a step-by-step framework to respond to situations where traditional airway management techniques may be inadequate. Current guidelines for airway management when inducing anesthesia where ventilation is inadequate recommend to call for help and limit attempts at tracheal intubation to three attempts plus one attempt by an experienced provider (3 + 1 rule) in order to prevent unnecessary trauma. The “3 + 1 rule” refers to a maximum of three attempts by the initial operator, followed by one additional attempt by a more experienced clinician before proceeding to alternative airway strategies. If direct laryngoscopy was utilized initially it is recommended to consider video laryngoscopy. This is followed by attempting bag mask ventilation then by placing a supraglotic airway, usually a laryngeal mask airway. If ventilation is still inadequate, it is recommended to consider an emergency invasive airway such as a surgical airway, rigid bronchoscopy, or extracorporeal membrane oxygenation (ECMO). Invasive airways should be performed by an individual well-trained in invasive airway techniques whenever possible. While preparing for invasive airway placement, it is recommended to continue to attempt alternative methods of tracheal intubation beyond the normally recommended 3 + 1 rule.

== Training and Competency ==
Advanced airway management requires formal training and ongoing competency assessment. Clinicians performing advanced airway procedures are typically trained in anesthesiology, emergency medicine, critical care, or prehospital emergency care. Simulation-based training, supervised clinical experience, and maintenance of procedural volume are important to ensure proficiency and reduce complications. Skill decline may occur if advanced airway techniques are performed infrequently, emphasizing the importance of continued education and practice.

== Pediatric considerations ==
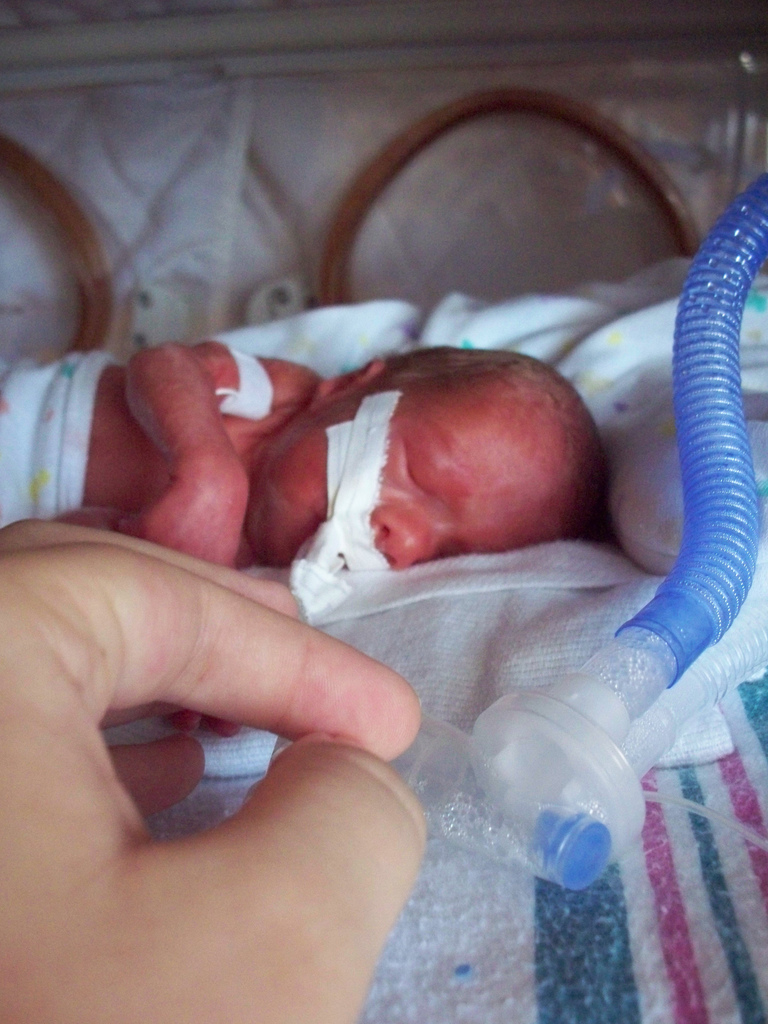
Premature infant with ventilator

Many advanced airway techniques may be applied to children. In the fields of pediatric anesthesiology, pediatric critical care, and pediatric emergency medicine, a clear passage between the lungs and the environment is essential.

Children have numerous anatomic differences from adults which present unique challenges when implementing advanced airway techniques. Neonates and infants have overall smaller airway anatomy including a shorter trachea and smaller nasal openings. Additionally, they have proportionally larger tongues and heads. As a result, infants are obligate nasal breathers until the age of 5 months. Given their overall smaller airway diameter, children are more susceptible to airway obstruction from swelling. Given the rapid growth throughout childhood, care must be taken to choose the proper sized airway device for every individual. Broselow tape is a tool used to help facilitate rapid and accurate equipment sizing decisions in pediatric emergency situations.

Supraglottic airway devices, direct laryngoscopy, indirect video laryngoscopy, and fiberoptic intubation are all techniques which can be used to secure the pediatric airway. In the event that these techniques cannot adequately ventilate the patient, a surgical airway may be required. Surgical help should be requested for invasive access, however, in scenarios in which a pediatric otorhinolaryngologist is not available, a needle cricothyrotomy is an emergency alternative.

== See also ==
- Advanced life support
- Basic airway management
- Tracheal intubation
