= Basic airway management =

- Demonstration of the bag valve mask to soldiers in class during a first responder course
- Other names: Basic airway maneuvers
- Specialty: Emergency medicine, prehospital medicine, anesthesia, critical care medicine, nursing, first-aid
- Uses: Clearing airway obstructions, preventing airway obstructions, ventilation

Basic airway management is a concept and set of medical procedures performed to prevent and treat airway obstruction and allow for adequate ventilation to a patient's lungs. This is accomplished by clearing or preventing obstructions of airways. Airway obstructions can occur in both conscious and unconscious individuals. They can also be partial or complete. Airway obstruction is commonly caused by the tongue, the airways itself, foreign bodies or materials from the body itself, such as blood or vomit. Contrary to advanced airway management, basic airway management technique do not rely on the use of invasive medical equipment and can be performed with less training. Medical equipment commonly used includes oropharyngeal airway, nasopharyngeal airway, bag valve mask, and pocket mask. Airway management is a primary consideration in cardiopulmonary resuscitation, anaesthesia, emergency medicine, intensive care medicine and first aid.

== Evaluation ==
=== Conscious ===
If the patient is conscious symptoms of airway obstructions may include:

- The person cannot speak or cry out or has difficulty doing so
- Breathing, if possible, is labored, producing gasping or stridor.
- The person has a violent and largely involuntary cough, gurgle, or vomiting noise. However, people with complete airway obstruction will have a limited or nonexistent ability to produce these symptoms since they require at least some air movement.
- The person desperately clutches their throat or mouth, or attempts to induce vomiting by putting their fingers down their throat.
- If the airway is not restored, the person's face, lips, or gums turn blue (cyanosis) from lack of oxygen.

=== Treatment ===
Treatment includes several procedures aiming at removing foreign bodies from the airways. Most modern protocols, including those of the American Heart Association, American Red Cross and the European Resuscitation Council, recommend several stages, designed to apply more pressure increasingly. Basic treatment includes several procedures aiming at removing foreign bodies from the airways. Most protocols recommend encouraging the victim to cough, followed by hard back slaps, and if none of these things work; abdominal thrusts (Heimlich maneuver) or chest thrusts. Some guidelines recommend alternating between abdominal thrusts and back slaps.

==== Encouraging the victim to cough ====
This stage was introduced in many protocols as it was found that many people were too quick to undertake potentially dangerous interventions, such as abdominal thrusts, for items that could have been dislodged without intervention. Also, if the choking is caused by an irritating substance rather than an obstructing one, and if conscious, the patient should be allowed to drink water on their own to try to clear the throat. Since the airway is already closed, there is very little danger of water entering the lungs. Coughing is normal after most of the irritants have cleared, and at this point, the patient will probably refuse any additional water for a short time.

==== Back blows ====
Most protocols recommend encouraging the victim to cough, followed by hard back slaps with the heel of the hand on the victim's upper back. The number to be used varies by training organization but is usually between five and twenty. For example, the European Resuscitation Council and the Mayo Clinic recommend five blows between the shoulder blades. The back slap uses percussion to create pressure behind the blockage, assisting the patient in dislodging the article. Other recommendations only use back blows for patients less than one-year-old, alternating between five back blows and five chest thrusts.

==== Abdominal thrusts ====
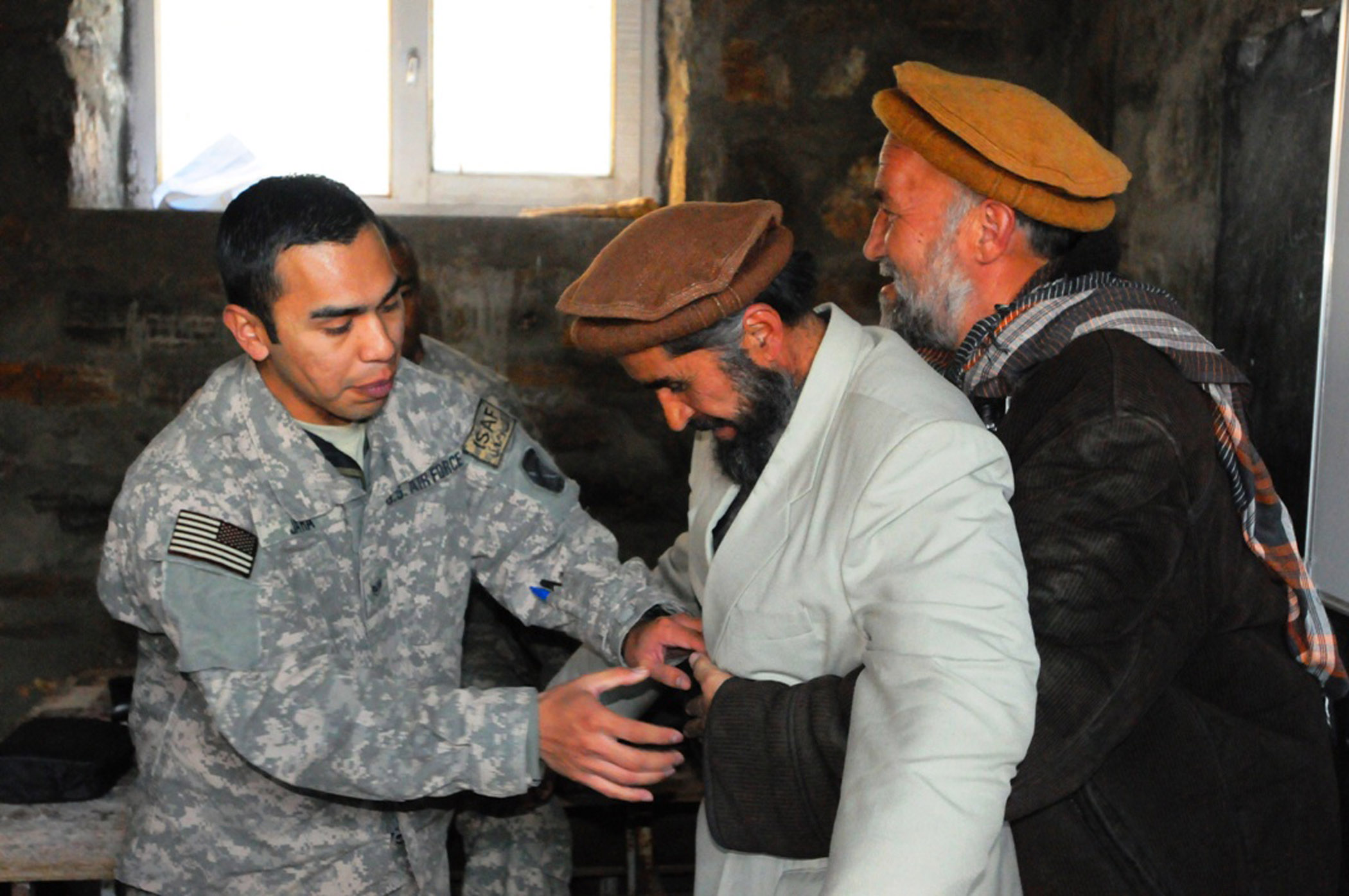
US medic teaches the abdominal thrusts to Afghans.

Performing abdominal thrusts involves a rescuer standing behind a patient and using their hands to exert pressure on the bottom of the diaphragm. This compresses the lungs and exerts pressure on any object lodged in the trachea, hopefully expelling it. The European Resuscitation Council and the Mayo Clinic recommend alternating between 5 back slaps and 5 abdominal thrusts in severe airway obstructions. While UpToDate recommends only using abdominal thrusts in adults and children more than one-year-old. In some areas, such as Australia, authorities believe there is not enough scientific evidence to support the use of abdominal thrusts, and their use is not recommended in first aid. Instead, chest thrusts are recommended. A person may also perform abdominal thrusts on himself by using a fixed object such as a railing or the back of a chair to apply pressure where a rescuer's hands would normally do so. As with other forms of the procedure, internal injuries may result.

==== Chest thrusts ====
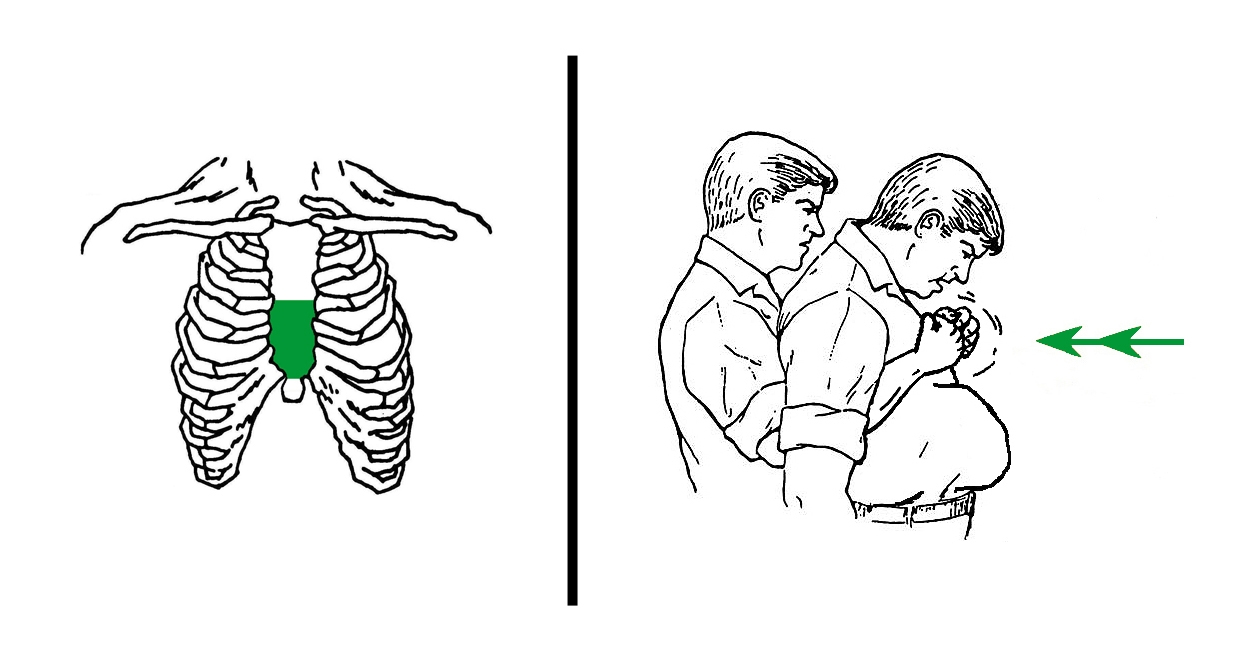
Demonstration of chest thrusts

If the patient can not receive pressure on the abdomen, the abdominal thrusts are replaced by chest thrusts. This is the case of pregnant women, obese people, and others. Chest thrusts are applied in the same manner as abdominal thrusts, but pressing inwards on the lower half of the sternum (the chest bone). As a reference, the zone of pressure of the chest thrusts in women would be normally higher than the level of the breasts. The pressure is not focused against the endpoint of the chest bone (which is named the xiphoid process), to avoid breaking it.

==== Finger sweep ====
The finger sweep should only be used if a foreign body is easily identified, a blind finger sweep should never be used. In the unresponsive patient receiving CPR, if a solid foreign body becomes visible it should be removed.

==== Anti-choking devices ====
In modern times, some commercial anti-choking devices (LifeVac, Dechoker, Lifewand, Willnice) have been developed and released to the market. They do not require electricity to work. The devices use a mechanical vacuum effect instead. Some choking cases where anti-choking devices were employed have appeared in the media.

==== Critics of the anti-choking devices ====
In 2023, a fresh cadaver study (a Caucasian male, 175 cm tall) was conducted using saltine crackers, grapes, and cashews. The DeChoker caused severe tongue trauma and failed to relieve the obstruction in all attempts. The LifeVac successfully removed barium-moistened saltine crackers but failed to remove all other foreign bodies. Both devices exerted significant pressure on the tongue. With the exception of the LifeVac saltine cracker, all attempts were completely unsuccessful in facilitating foreign body aspiration. Furthermore, both devices can cause significant pressure and trauma to the oral cavity in clinical settings. The authors concluded that non-physicians should continue to follow the International Committee on Resuscitation guidelines to help facilitate foreign body aspiration.

In 2024, the Resuscitation Council of Great Britain (RCUK) did not recommend the use of foreign body suction devices as standard care for choking. Reasons: There is insufficient clinical evidence that such devices are effective or safe for use in cases of choking. Standard first aid techniques—back blows, abdominal thrusts (Heimlich maneuver), and chest compressions—remain recommended and proven. Suction devices should only be used as a last resort when all standard methods have failed, and only by trained individuals. The use of such devices should not replace basic first aid training. The RCUK has called for further independent research to assess the effectiveness and safety of these devices without banning them.

A 2025 pilot study on cadavers showed that the effectiveness of the LifeVac was extremely low, with only 1 successful attempt in 21 (≈4.8%). Failures were attributed to poor mask fit (especially in edentulous cadavers), insufficient pressure, and anatomical limitations of the model.

That same year, Forbes reported how a business couple made $5 million selling the banned medical device Dechoker on Amazon, despite FDA warnings about its dangers and lack of evidence of effectiveness. The FDA officially banned the sale of Dechoker in the United States due to the lack of clinical evidence of its effectiveness and health risks, especially in children. Despite the ban, the device continued to be actively promoted as a “lifesaver,” with emotional videos and positive reviews. Legal documents show that sellers were aware of the ban but circumvented it by using third-party accounts and changing product descriptions. The medical community criticizes such actions as unethical and dangerous, as they can create a false sense of security in parents.

The LifeVac choking device is also currently under scrutiny due to FDA warnings regarding its unauthorized marketing and safety concerns, but it has not been officially recalled. FDA issued a warning letter to LifeVac LLC on September 18, 2025, stating that the LifeVac Rescue Suction Device is being marketed without the necessary premarket approval. The FDA classifies this device as a Class III medical device, which requires rigorous testing and approval before it can be sold to consumers. The FDA has expressed concerns that the continued marketing of LifeVac could jeopardize public health and safety, as the device's safety and effectiveness have not been established.

== Unconscious ==
Evaluation of an unconscious patient's breathing is often performed by the look, listen, and feel method. The ear is placed over the person's mouth so breathing can be heard and felt while looking for rising chest or abdomen. The procedure should not take longer than 10 seconds. As in conscious patients stridor can be heard if there is a partial airway obstruction. The tongue may also partially obstruct the airway resulting in a snoring sound. If the airway is obstructed by liquid it may produce a gurgling sound. Complete airway obstruction may not have any noise. In the unconscious patient agonal breathing is often mistaken for airway obstructions. If there is respiratory arrest or agonal breathing CPR is indicated.

=== Treatment ===
The head-tilt/chin-lift is the most reliable method of opening the airway.

Treatment of unconscious patients focuses on preventing or treating obstructions of the airway, such as head-tilt/chin-lift and jaw-thrust maneuvers, while the use of the recovery position mainly prevents aspiration of things like stomach content or blood.

The head-tilt/chin-lift is the primary maneuver used in any patient in whom cervical spine injury is not a concern. The maneuver is performed by tilting the head backward in unconscious patients, often by applying pressure to the forehead and the chin. Head-tilt/chin-lift is taught in most first aid courses as the standard way of clearing an airway.

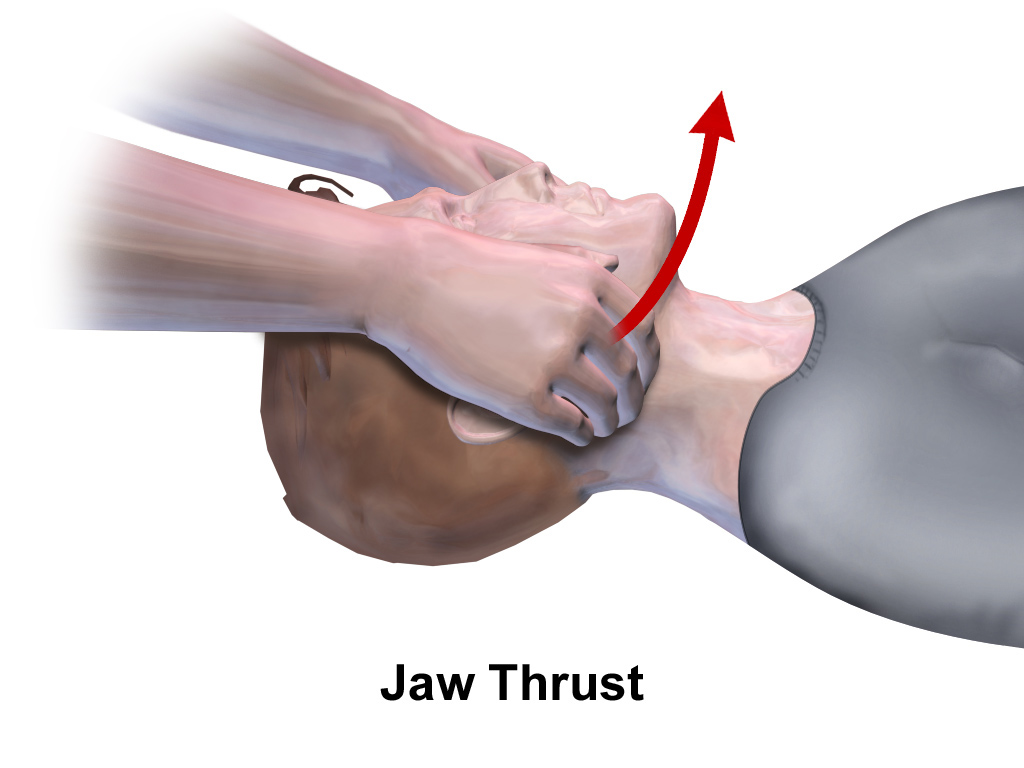
Visual demonstration of jaw thrust

The jaw-thrust maneuver is an effective airway technique, particularly in patients in whom cervical spine injury is a concern. The jaw thrust is a technique used on patients with a suspected or possible cervical spinal cord injury and is used on a supine patient. The practitioner uses their index and middle fingers to physically pull the posterior (back) of the mandible towards the ceiling, while their thumbs open the mouth.

Sketch of recovery position

The recovery position refers to one of a series of variations on a lateral recumbent or three-quarters prone position of the body, in which an unconscious but breathing patient can be placed. The use of the recovery position helps to prevent aspiration.

Most airway maneuvers are associated with some movement of the cervical spine. Cervical collars for reducing cervical spine movement can cause problems maintaining an airway. It is recommended that manual stabilization of the cervical spine is held if the cervical collar must be removed to maintain the patient's airway.

== Airway adjuncts ==
There are some pieces of medical equipment that are used in basic airway management. When used correctly some help maintain an open airway, like an oropharyngeal airway. Other devices help ventilate the patient so oxygen can be delivered to the lungs and circulated through the body.

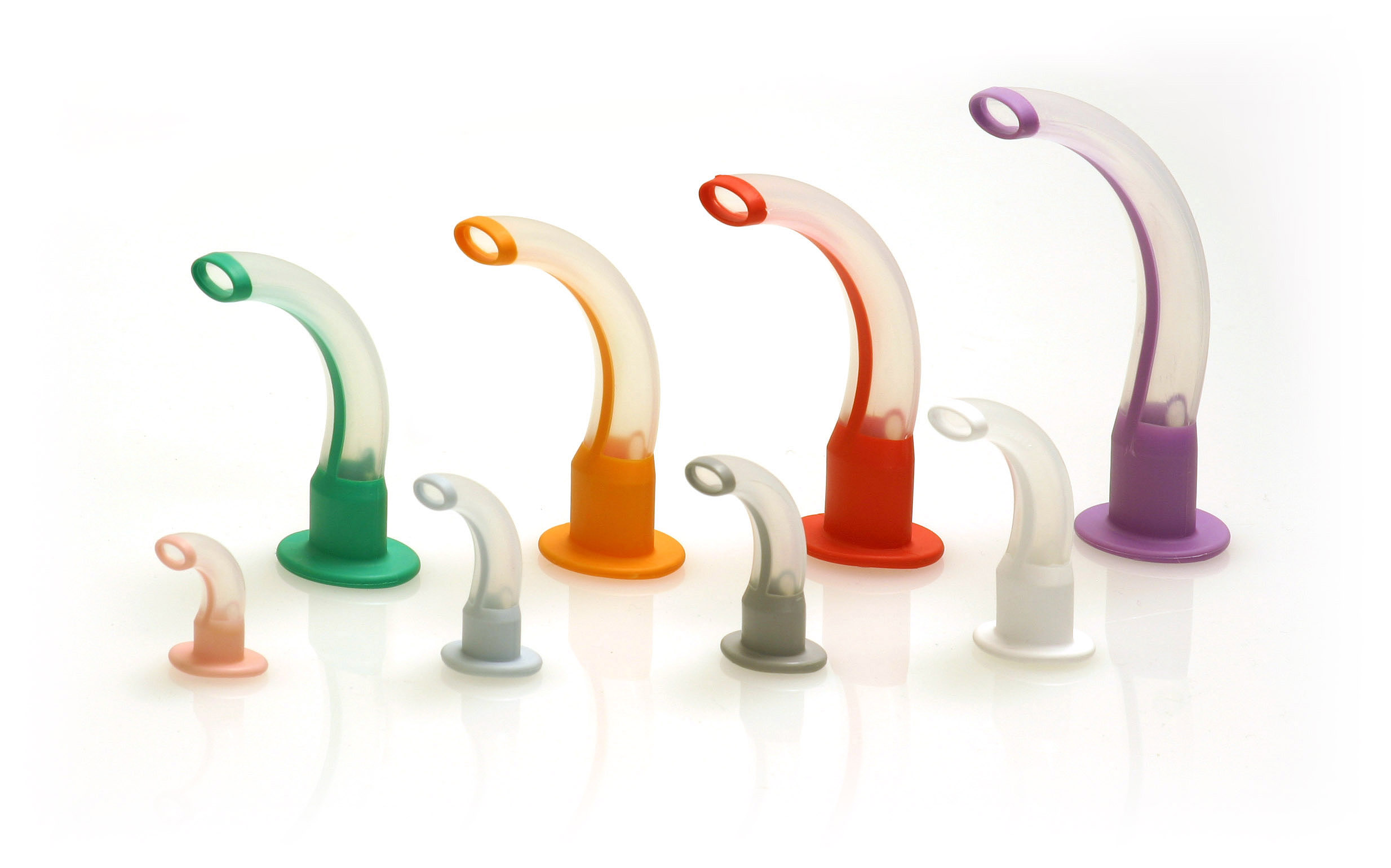
- Oropharyngeal airways of various sizes
  Oropharyngeal airways (OPA) are curved pieces of plastic that help to maintain a patent airway in unconscious patients, without a gag-reflex. To use the appropriate size is selected, and then the OPA is inserted with the tip towards the roof of the mouth. When the tip has reached the soft palate of the mouth, the OPA is rotated so the tip is facing the feet of the patient. OPAs are not to be used on conscious patients, or patients with a gag reflex.
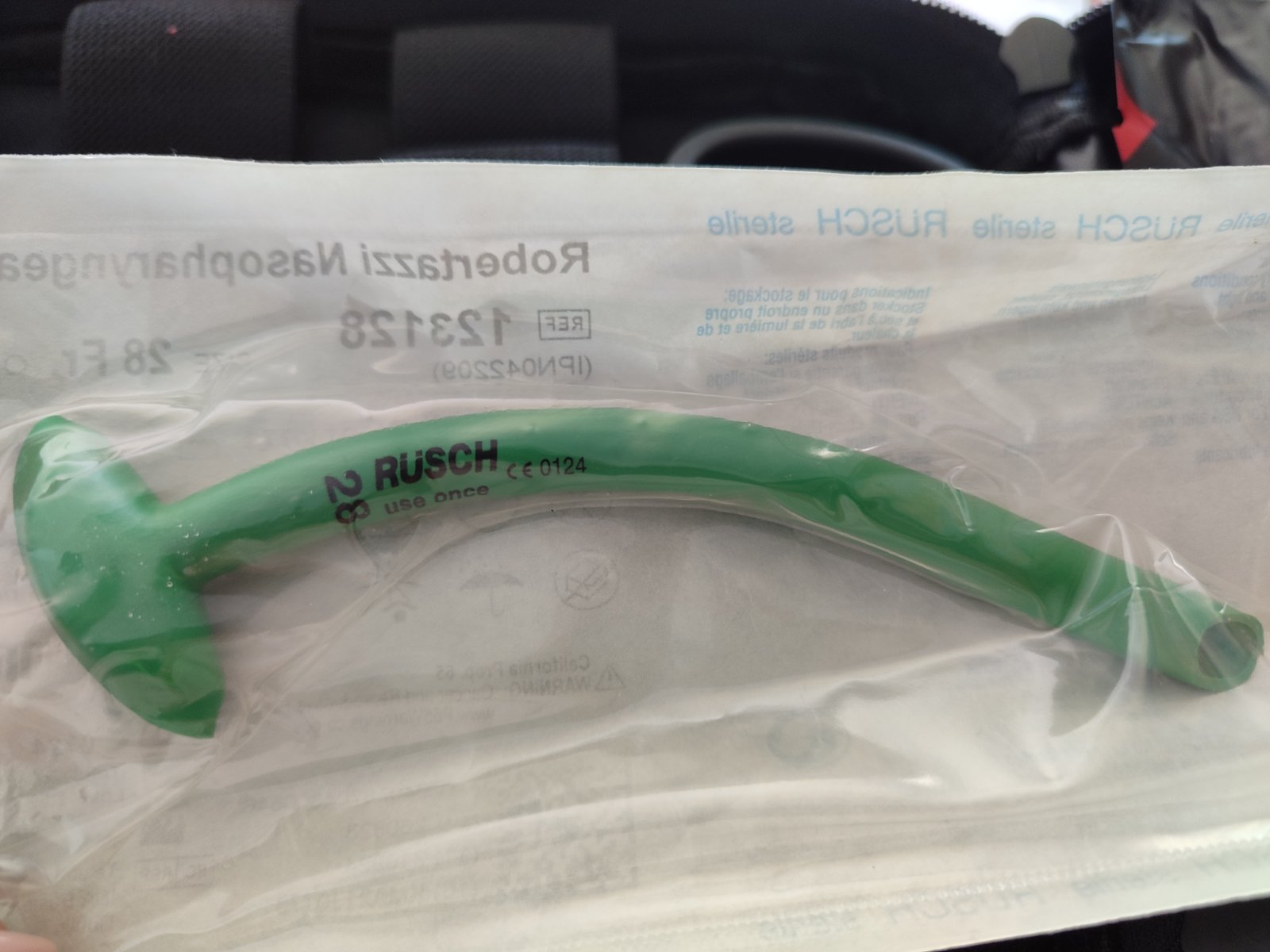
- Nasopharyngeal airway in packaging
  Nasopharyngeal airways (NPA) are rubber tubes with a flange at one end. When properly used and with the correct size it allows for air to flow between the nose into the lungs. To use choose the appropriate size. Use a water-based lubrication gel to coat the outside of the NPA and the selected nostril. The NPA is inserted with the bevel facing the septum and inserted until the flange is at the nostril. Nasopharyngeal airways can be used in conscious or unconscious patients.
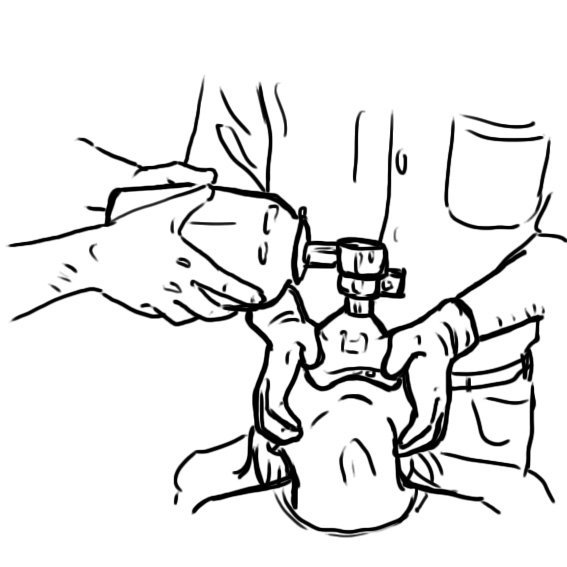
- Demonstration of two-person bag valve mask technique
  Bag valve masks (BVM) provides positive pressure ventilation to patients that are not breathing or not breathing adequately to sustain oxygenation to the body. When used properly in conjunction with basic airway maneuvers and airway adjuncts it allows for adequate ventilation of the patient. The BVM consists of a mask attached to a shutter valve. The valve allows air to flow into the lungs but prevents air from the lungs from filling the bag for the next breath. This prevents rebreathing of air with low oxygen. The bag inflates with room air, or it can be attached to bottled oxygen. The optimal use of the BVM is with two people, one who secures the mask to the patient's face ensuring a good seal between the patient's skin and the mask. The other rescuer squeezes the bag taking care to provide adequate volume without over ventilating the patient. The BVM can also be used by one person, one hand is used to secure the mask to the face, while the other hand squeezes the bag. Bag valve masks can also be attached to advanced airways once in place.
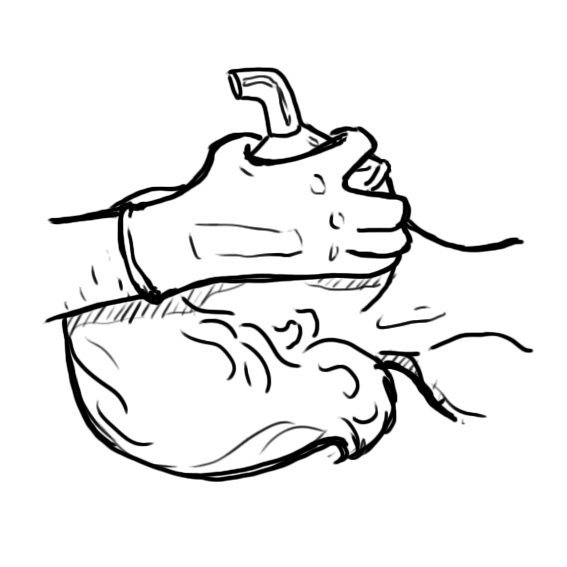
- Demonstration of pocket mask use
  Pocket Masks are used to provide rescue breaths similar to a bag valve mask, but the rescuer is using their own breath instead of a bag. The device consists of a mask attached to a one-way filter valve. The filter valve prevents bodily fluids such as blood vomit from entering the rescuer's mouth. The mask is secured to the face with both hands, the rescuer then places their mouth onto the opening and breathes into the mask. This allows ventilation to occur. Pocket masks are more portable and less expensive than bag valve masks, while also allowing both hands to be used to form the seal when delivering rescue breaths.

== See also ==
- First-aid treatment of choking
- Basic life support
