= Recovery position =

First aid technique

All forms of the recovery position share basic principles. The mouth is downward so that fluid can drain from the patient's airway; the chin is well away from the throat to keep the epiglottis open. Arms and legs are nested to stabilize the position of the patient.

In first aid, the recovery position (also called semi-prone) is one of a series of variations on a lateral recumbent or three-quarters prone position of the body, often used for unconscious but breathing casualties.

An unconscious person, a person who is assessed on the Glasgow Coma Scale (GCS) at eight or below, in a supine position (on the back) may not be able to maintain an open airway as a conscious person would. This can lead to an obstruction of the airway, restricting the flow of air and preventing gaseous exchange, which then causes hypoxia, which is life-threatening. Thousands of fatalities occur every year in casualties where the cause of unconsciousness was not fatal, but where airway obstruction caused the patient to suffocate. This is especially true for unconscious pregnant women; once turned on to their left side, pressure is relieved on the inferior vena cava, and venous return is not restricted. The cause of unconsciousness can be any reason from trauma to intoxication from alcohol.

It is not necessarily used by health care professionals in an institutional setting, as they may have access to more advanced airway management techniques, such as tracheal intubation.

== Purpose ==
The recovery position is designed to prevent suffocation through obstruction of the airway, which can occur in unconscious supine patients. The supine patient is at risk of airway obstruction from two routes:

- Mechanical obstruction: In this instance, a physical object obstructs the airway of the patient. In most cases this is the patient's own tongue, as the unconsciousness leads to a loss of control and muscle tone, causing the tongue to fall to the back of the pharynx, creating an obstruction. This can be controlled (to an extent) by a trained person using airway management techniques.
- Fluid obstruction: Fluids, usually vomit, can collect in the pharynx, effectively causing the person to drown. The loss of muscular control which causes the tongue to block the throat can also lead to the stomach contents flowing into the throat, called passive regurgitation. Fluid which collects in the back of the throat can also flow down into the lungs. Another complication can be stomach acid burning the inner lining of the lungs, causing aspiration pneumonia.

Placing a patient in the recovery position gives gravity assistance to the clearance of physical obstruction of the airway by the tongue, and also gives a clear route by which fluid can drain from the airway.

The International Liaison Committee on Resuscitation (ILCOR) does not recommend one specific recovery position, but advises on six key principles to be followed:

1. The casualty should be in as near a true lateral position as possible with the head dependent to allow free drainage of fluid.
2. The position should be stable.
3. Any pressure of the chest that impairs breathing should be avoided.
4. It should be possible to turn the victim onto the side and return to the back easily and safely, having particular regard to the possibility of cervical spine injury.
5. Good observation of and access to the airway should be possible.
6. The position itself should not give rise to any injury to the casualty.

== History ==
The earliest recognition that placing unconscious patients on their side would prevent obstruction of the airway was by Robert Bowles, a doctor at the Victoria Hospital in Folkestone, England. In 1891 he presented a paper with the title 'On Stertor, Apoplexy, and the Management of the Apoplectic State' in relation to stroke patients with noisy breathing from airway obstruction (also known as stertor).

This paper was taken up by anaesthetist Frederick Hewitt from the London Hospital who advised a sideways position for postoperative patients. This thinking was, however, not widely adopted, with surgical textbooks 50 years later still recommending leaving anaesthetised patients in a supine position.

First aid organisations were similarly slow in adopting the idea of the recovery position, with 1930s and 1940s first aid manuals from the British Red Cross and St John Ambulance both recommending lying a patient on their back. The 1938 British Red Cross First Aid Manual goes so far as to instruct "place the head in a such as position that the windpipe is kept straight, keeping the head up if the face is flushed, and in line with the body if it is pale". By contrast, the St. John manual advocated turning the head to the side, but it was not until the 1950 40th edition of the St. John Manual that it was added "if breathing is noisy (bubbling through secretions), turn the patient into the three-quarters prone position", which is very similar to a modern recovery position.

A large number of positions were experimented with, mostly in Europe, as the United States did not widely take up the recovery position until its adoption by the American Heart Association in 1992. Positions included the "Coma Position", "Rautek's Position" and the "HAINES (High Arm IN Endangered Spine) position".

In 1992, the European Resuscitation Council adopted a new position where the arm nearest the floor was brought out in front of the patient, whereas it had previously been placed behind the patient. This change was made due to several reported cases of nerve and blood vessel damage in the arms of patients.

ILCOR made its recommendations on the basic principles for recovery positions in 1996, but does not prescribe a specific position, and consequently, there are several in use around the world.

== See also ==
- Sims' position
- Basic airway management
- Basic life support – Emergency medical care by first responder
- Human positions – Physical configurations of the human body
