= Heimlich maneuver =

First aid procedure

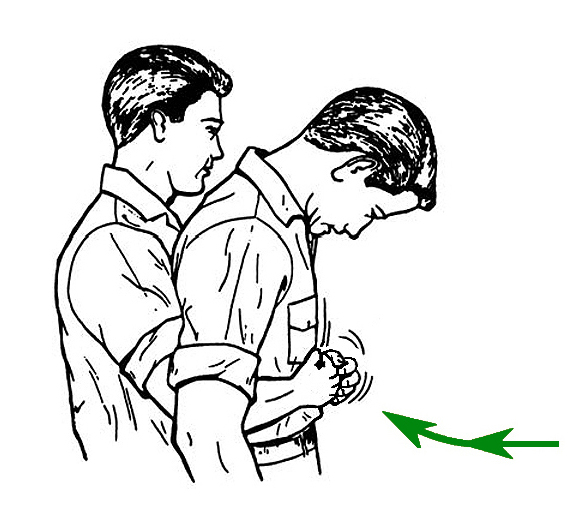
- Performing the Heimlich maneuver
- Other names: Abdominal thrusts; Heimlich manoeuvre

The Heimlich maneuver (spelled manoeuvre in British English), also known as an abdominal thrust, is a first-aid procedure used to treat upper-airway obstructions (or choking) by foreign objects. American doctor Henry Heimlich is often credited for its development. To perform a Heimlich maneuver, a rescuer stands behind a choking victim and uses their hands to apply pressure to the bottom of the victim's diaphragm. This compresses the lungs and exerts pressure on the object lodged in the trachea in an effort to expel it.

Most modern protocols, including those of the American Heart Association, American Red Cross, and European Resuscitation Council, recommend that treatment of airway obstructions be performed in several stages designed to apply increasing levels of pressure. Most protocols recommend encouraging the victim to cough, followed by hard back slaps, and finally abdominal thrusts or chest thrusts as a final resort. Some guidelines also recommend alternating between abdominal thrusts and back slaps.

== History ==
Thoracic surgeon and medical researcher Henry Heimlich, noted for promulgating abdominal thrusts, claimed that back slaps were proven to cause death by lodging foreign objects into the windpipe. A 1982 Yale study by Richard L. Day, Edmund S. Crelin and Arthur B. DuBois persuaded the American Heart Association (AHA) to stop recommending back blows for dealing with choking. The study claimed that in seated subjects, the Heimlich maneuver produced more air pressure than back blows. In addition, it was theorised that back blows could throw the subjects head back which could cause the foreign object to slide further down the throat. However, there is no evidence to prove this and since the study was partially funded by Heimlich's own foundation, could be called into question. According to Dr. Roger White of the Mayo Clinic and American Heart Association, “There was never any science here. Heimlich overpowered science all along the way with his slick tactics and intimidation, and everyone, including us at the AHA, caved in.”

Henry Heimlich also promoted abdominal thrusts as a treatment for drowning and asthma attacks. The Red Cross now contests those claims. The Heimlich Institute has stopped advocating on their website for the Heimlich maneuver to be used as a first aid measure for drowning victims. Heimlich's son, Peter M. Heimlich, alleges that in August 1974 his father published the first of a series of fraudulent case reports in order to promote the use of abdominal thrusts for near-drowning rescue. The 2005 drowning rescue guidelines of the American Heart Association did not include citations of Heimlich's work, and warned against the use of the Heimlich maneuver for drowning rescue as unproven and dangerous, due to its risk of vomiting leading to aspiration.

In May 2016, Henry Heimlich, then age 96, claimed to have personally used the maneuver to save the life of a fellow resident at his retirement home in Cincinnati. It was alleged to be either the first or second time Heimlich himself used his namesake maneuver to save the life of someone in a non-simulated choking situation. According to Heimlich's son, Peter M. Heimlich, "both 'rescues' were bogus."

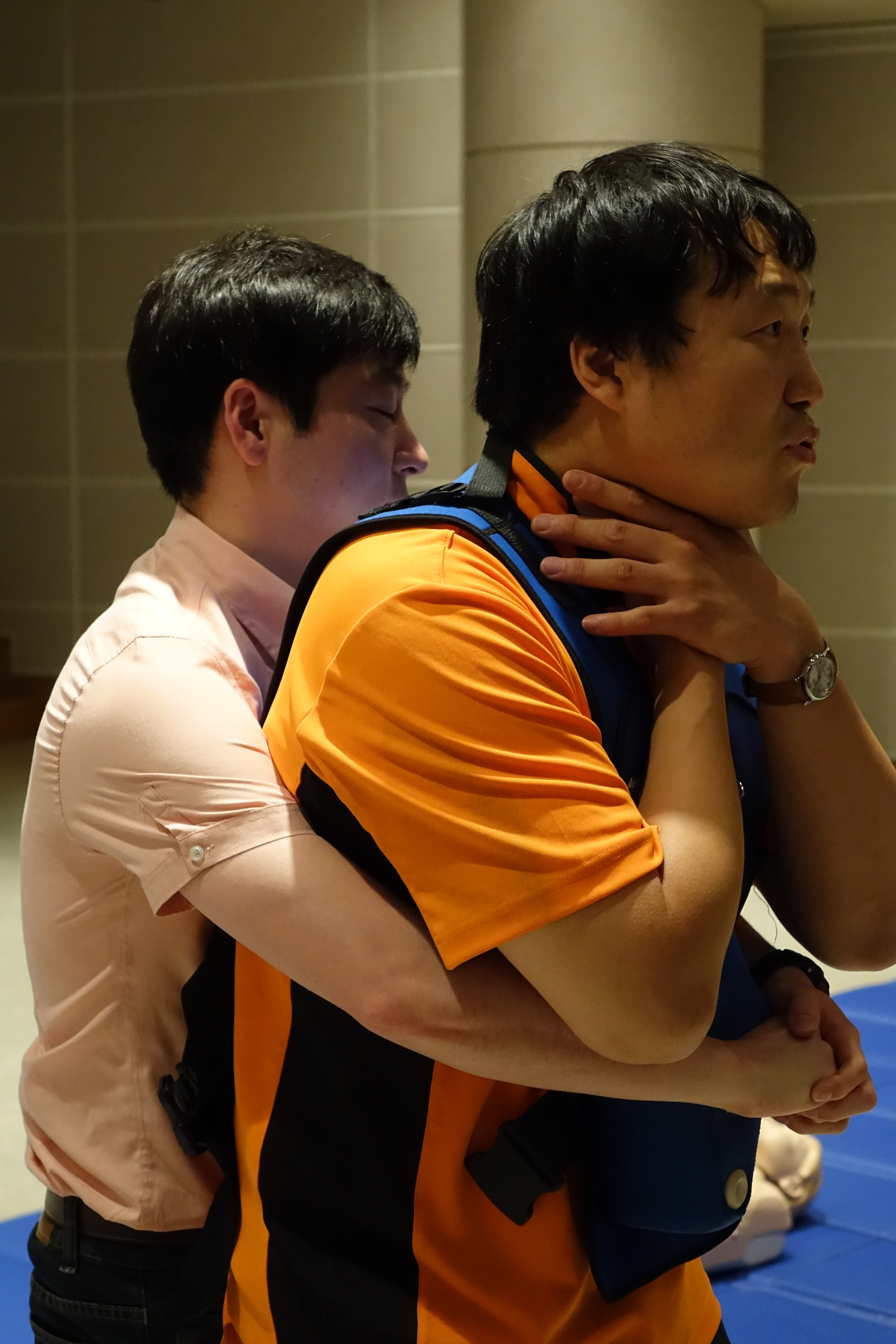
The man on the right is performing the universal sign of choking by placing both hands on his throat.

== Technique ==
Both the American Red Cross and UK National Health Service (NHS) advise that for a first attempt, a rescuer should encourage the patient to expel the obstruction by coughing. As a second measure, the rescuer should deliver five slaps to the back after bending the patient forward. Abdominal thrusts are recommended only if these methods fail.

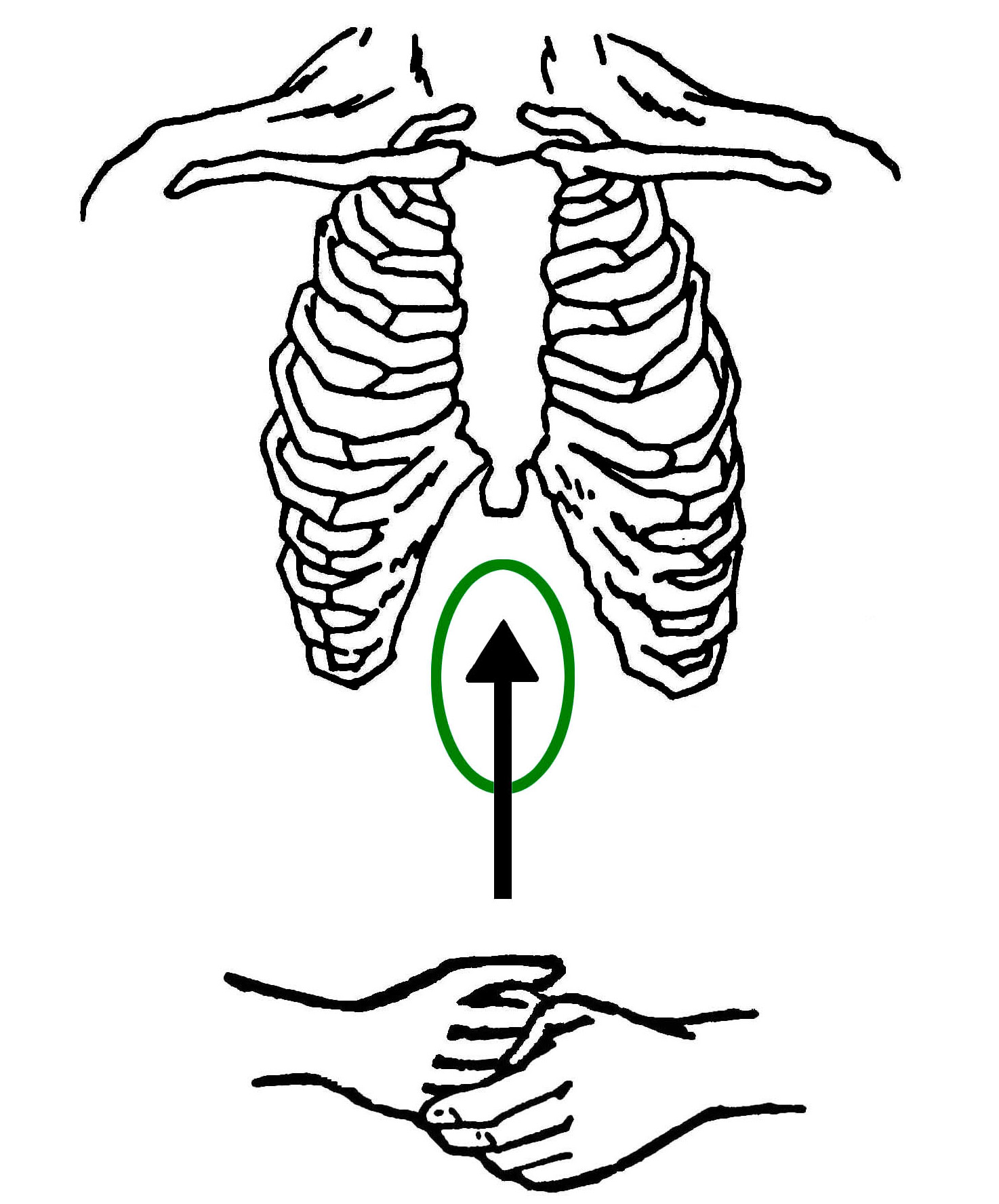
Point of application of abdominal thrusts (between chest and navel). The hands press inward and upward.

The American Red Cross, the NHS, the European Resuscitation Council and the Mayo Clinic recommend a repeating cycle of five back slaps and five abdominal thrusts. They are not recommended on children below the age of one. In contrast to the prevailing American and European advice, the Australian Resuscitation Council recommends chest thrusts instead of abdominal thrusts.

To perform a Heimlich maneuver, a rescuer stands behind an upright patient, using the hands to exert forceful pressure on the bottom of the diaphragm. As an example, WebMD recommends making a fist with one hand and grasping the fist with the other in order to press with both just above the patient's navel. This compresses the lungs and exerts pressure on any object lodged in the trachea in an effort to expel it. The pressure amounts to an artificially induced cough. To assist a larger person, more force may be needed. The Mayo Clinic recommends the same placement of fist and hand, with upward thrusts as if the rescuer is attempting to lift the victim.

If the victim cannot receive pressure on the abdomen (for example, in case of pregnancy or excessive obesity), chest thrusts are advised. These are applied on the lower half of the chest bone, but not in the very endpoint (the xiphoid process, which could be broken).

For victims who are not in an upright position, The American National Institutes of Health recommends positioning the victim on the back, then straddling the torso and employing chest thrusts.

It is possible for conscious choking victims to perform the procedure on themselves, without assistance.

Because of the forceful nature of the procedure, even when performed correctly, abdominal thrusts can injure the victim. Bruising to the abdomen is highly likely and more serious injuries can occur, including fracture of the xiphoid process or ribs. The NHS recommends that victims subjected to abdominal thrusts should seek medical attention after the event.

Researchers at Royal Brompton Hospital have demonstrated that levels of intrathoracic pressures (50–60 cmH_{2}O) exerted by inward abdominal thrusts are similar to those produced when the force is directed both inward and upward. The researchers argue that this may be easier to perform with less concern for injury to the rib cage or upper abdominal organs. Self-administered abdominal thrusts by study participants produced similar pressures to those generated by administering first aid. The highest pressures were produced by participants performing an abdominal thrust by pressing onto the back of a chair (115 cmH_{2}O).

== See also ==
- First-aid treatment of choking
- Basic airway management
- Basic life support
