= Nasopharyngeal airway =

Tube inserted through the nose into the throat as an artificial airway

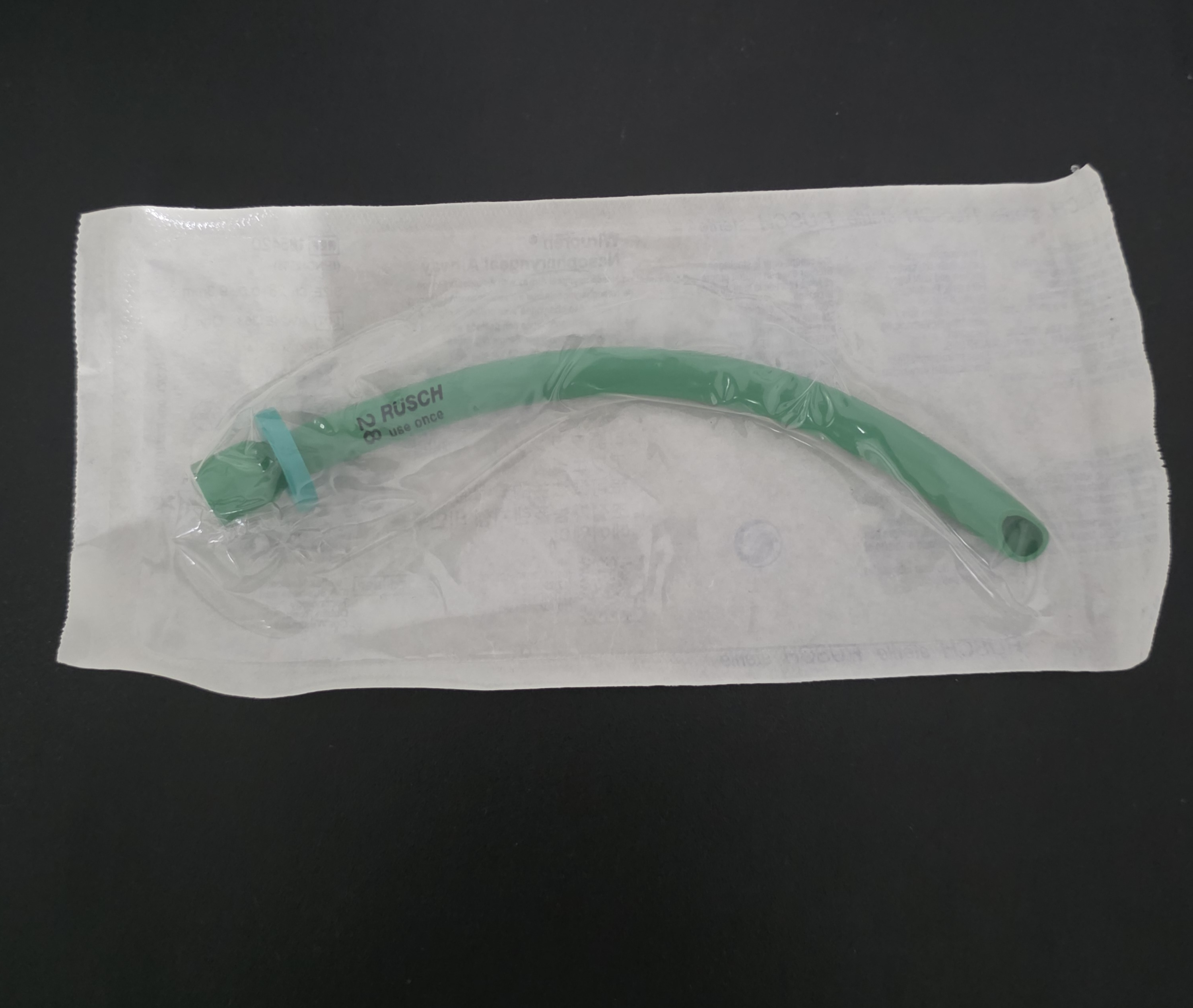
- A nasopharyngeal airway, size 28 Fr.
- ICD-9-CM: 96.01

In medicine, a nasopharyngeal airway (NPA), nasal trumpet (because of its flared end), or nose hose, is a type of airway adjunct, a tube that is designed to be inserted through the nasal passage down into the posterior pharynx to secure an open airway. It was introduced by Hans Karl Wendl in 1958. When a patient becomes unconscious, the muscles in the jaw commonly relax and can allow the tongue to slide back and obstruct the airway. This makes airway management necessary, and an NPA is one of the available tools. The purpose of the flared end is to prevent the device from becoming lost inside the patient's nose.

== Sizes ==
As with other catheters, NPAs are measured using the French catheter scale, but sizes are usually also quoted in millimeters. Typical sizes include: 6.5 mm/28FR, 7.0 mm/30FR, 7.5 mm/32FR, 8.0 mm/34FR, and 8.5 mm/36FR.

== Indications and contraindications ==
These devices are used by emergency care professionals such as EMTs and paramedics in situations where an artificial form of airway maintenance is necessary, but tracheal intubation is impossible, inadvisable, or outside the practitioner's scope of practice. An NPA is often used in patients who are conscious or have an altered level of consciousness where an oropharyngeal airway would trigger the gag reflex. The use of an NPA is contraindicated when there is trauma to the face, especially the nose or if there is a suspected skull fracture.

== Insertion ==
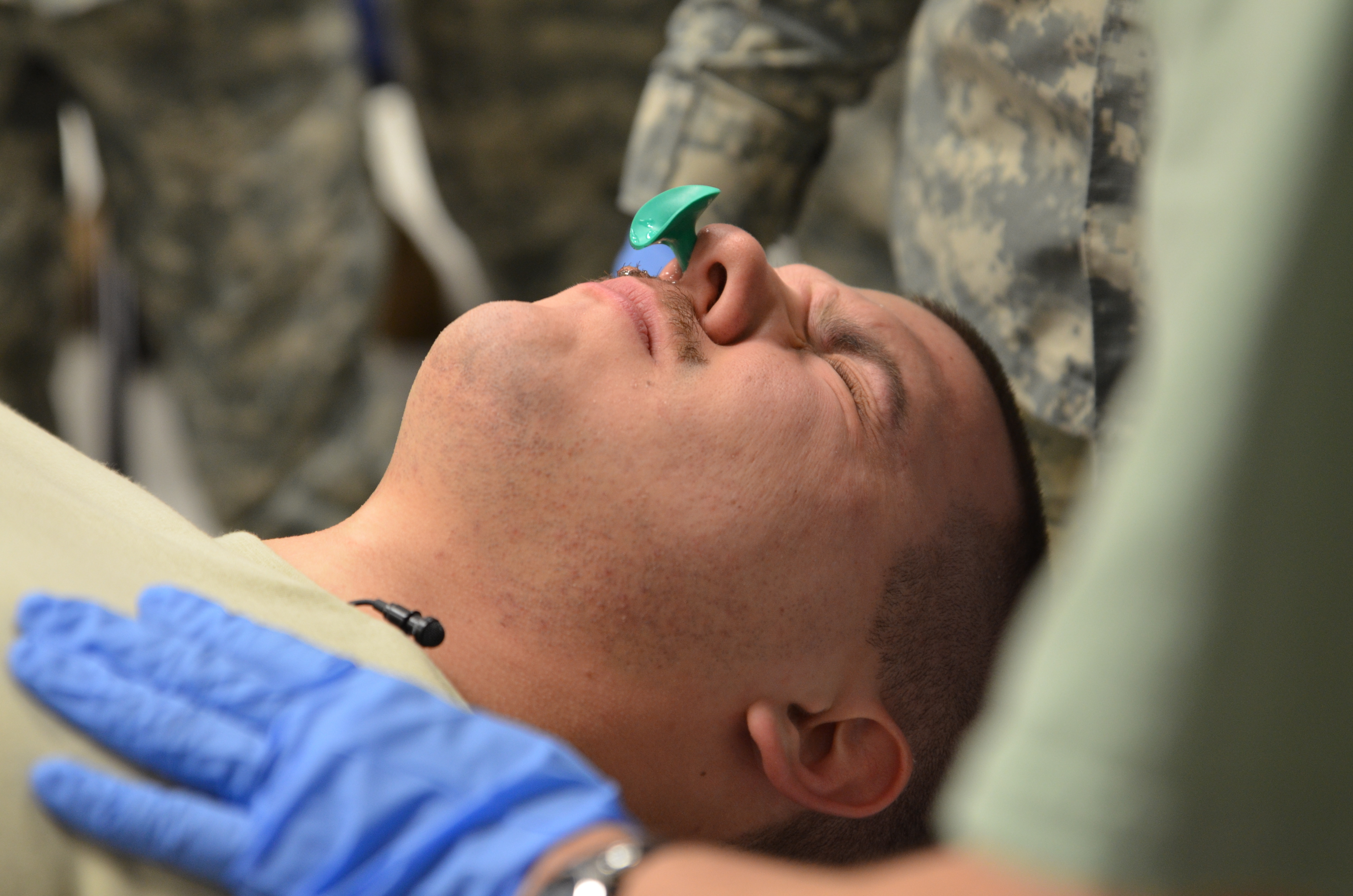
A nasopharyngeal airway inserted in the right nostril of a patient.

The correct size airway is chosen by measuring the device on the patient: the device should reach from the patient's nostril to the earlobe or the angle of the jaw. The outside of the tube is lubricated with a lubricant, often water-soluble (depending on the product) so that it enters the nose more easily while also lowering the chance of causing nasal trauma to the patient. The device is inserted with the bevel facing the nasal septum until the flared end rests against the nostril.
