= Airway obstruction =

Blockage in the respiratory system

- Specialty: Otolaryngology, pulmonology, anesthesiology, emergency medicine

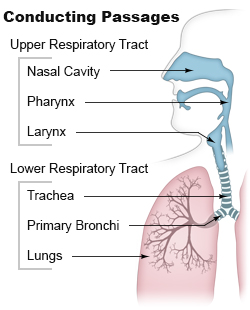
Upper and lower airway

Airway obstruction is a blockage of respiration in the airway that hinders the free flow of air. Airway obstructions can occur either in the upper airway or lower airway. The upper airway consists of the nose, throat, and larynx. The lower airway comprises the trachea, bronchi, and bronchioles.

Airway obstruction is a life-threatening condition and requires urgent attention.

== Upper airway obstruction ==
=== Causes ===
The causes of upper airway obstructions can be acute or chronic. Acute causes of upper airway obstruction include foreign body aspiration, blunt trauma to the neck, infection, and swelling due to allergies or other inflammatory conditions. In children, viral infections such as croup or epiglottitis are frequent causes. Adults are more likely to experience obstruction from enlargement of the tonsils or vocal cord paralysis. Obstructive sleep apnea is the most common chronic cause of upper airway obstruction.

=== Symptoms ===
Stridor is a high-pitched sound which occurs during breathing and is associated with obstruction at the level of the larynx. Difficulty swallowing and changes in voice are common symptoms. If there is total obstruction, severe respiratory distress or cyanosis due to hypoxia (lack of oxygen in the blood) can occur.

=== Diagnosis ===
Diagram of bronchoscopy

With acute upper airway obstruction, respiratory distress can rapidly lead to respiratory failure without appropriate management necessitating urgent and comprehensive assessment of ABCs (airway, breathing, and circulation).

Imaging studies, including x-rays and CT scans, can aid diagnosis and quickly assess the obstruction's extent. For children, ultrasound or MRI are preferred as they do not involve radiation. Flexible laryngoscopy or bronchoscopy can directly visualize the airway.

=== Management ===
Treatment depends on how severe the patient's condition is and the cause of the obstruction. If the patient is choking on a foreign body, the Heimlich maneuver can be used. More invasive methods, such as intubation, may be necessary to secure the airway. In severe cases, intubation may be difficult and a cricothyrotomy or tracheostomy may be necessary.

Infections typically cause obstruction by swelling and are usually treated with antibiotics or corticosteroids to reduce inflammation. For causes like tumors or abscesses, surgical removal may be required.

=== Prognosis ===
With prompt treatment, outcomes are usually favorable. This is especially true for reversible conditions, like foreign body aspiration. Chronic conditions, like vocal cord paralysis and sleep apnea, may need ongoing care. If managed well, they usually have good outcomes.

=== Complications ===
Untreated or prolonged upper airway obstruction can cause severe, life-threatening complications.

- Hypoxia: Low blood oxygen can cause confusion and unconsciousness. It can also lead to cardiac arrest if not treated.
- Aspiration pneumonia: Particles entering the lungs can cause infections.
- Structural changes: Repeating obstruction or trauma may scar or narrow the upper airway. This is called subglottic or tracheal stenosis.
- Voice changes: Chronic damage to the vocal cords may cause permanent voice changes or loss.
- Cardiac arrest: Severe obstruction can cause asphyxiation, leading to heart failure if untreated.

== Lower airway obstruction ==
=== Causes ===
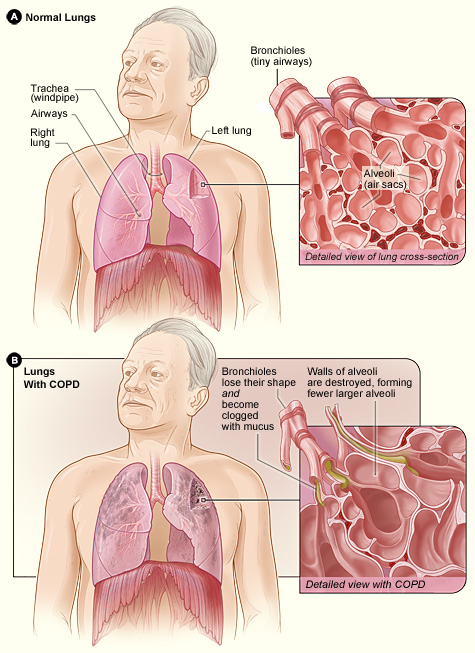
Figure A shows the location of the lungs and airways in the body. The inset image shows a detailed cross-section of the bronchioles and alveoli. Figure B shows lungs damaged by COPD. The inset image shows a detailed cross-section of the damaged bronchioles and alveolar walls.

Lower airway obstruction is mainly caused by increased resistance in the bronchioles, usually due to a decreased radius of the bronchioles. This typically occurs due to constriction and inflammation of the bronchioles that reduces the air inhaled in each breath. This restriction is worsened by mucus production and airway remodeling in chronic conditions. Diseases that cause lower airway obstruction are called obstructive lung diseases. Examples include chronic obstructive pulmonary disease (COPD), asthma, and bronchitis.

=== Symptoms ===
Patients often experience wheezing, shortness of breath, and a chronic cough. A wheeze is a coarse, whistling sound in the airways during breathing. Worsening symptoms may include increased mucus production and reduced exercise tolerance.

=== Diagnosis ===
Spirometry that measures the FEV1/FVC ratio, is the gold standard for diagnosing lower airway obstruction. A decreased ratio indicates obstruction.

Chest X-rays can help exclude alternative diagnoses or include other comorbidities. CT images can provide more insight into any possible structural abnormalities.

=== Management ===
Treatment of lower airway obstruction includes:

- Bronchodilators help relax and widen the airways, which improve the airflow.
- Inhaled corticosteroids can help decrease airway inflammation.
- Long-term oxygen therapy is usually reserved for more severe chronic cases.

Severe cases may need hospitalization and mechanical ventilation to help support breathing by keeping the airways open.

=== Outcomes ===
Prognosis depends on the severity and cause of the obstruction. With early diagnosis and treatment, conditions like asthma often have a good outcome. But, chronic diseases like COPD are progressive, requiring ongoing management.

=== Complications ===
Complications of lower airway obstruction, often from chronic diseases, include:

- Chronic hypoxia: Prolonged obstruction reduces oxygen supply. This leads to fatigue, confusion, and eventual organ damage.
- Cor Pulmonale: Persistent low oxygen levels can strain the right side of the heart. This can lead to right-sided heart failure.
- Frequent infections: There is an increased risk of bacterial infections like pneumonia.

== See also ==
- Recurrent airway obstruction
