= Thomas Cecil Gray =

English anaesthetist

Thomas Cecil Gray CBE KCSG (11 March 1913 – 5 January 2008) was a pioneering English anaesthetist.

== Early life ==
Gray was born in Liverpool in 1913. The only son of Thomas and Ethel Gray of Thornton, he was educated at Ampleforth College in Yorkshire. At the age of 18, he joined the order of monks at the Benedictine college of Ampleforth, but after two months it became clear that this was not the vocation for him and he returned to Liverpool to pursue medicine, qualifying in 1937.

== Professional life ==
He began a career in General Practice, giving anaesthetics for his patients when they needed surgery. Anaesthesia became his main interest, and he gained a Diploma in Anaesthetics in 1941. He developed an extensive practice in the leading local hospitals, before joining the Royal Army Medical Corps. He was posted to a mobile neurosurgical unit in Oxford, and later to North Africa.

Returning to Liverpool University in 1947 as Reader, he established the Department of Anaesthesia, and introduced tubocurarine with mechanical lung ventilation. This became known as the 'Liverpool technique', based on the triad of unconsciousness, analgesia and muscle relaxation, with a markedly lower complication rate than deep inhalational anaesthesia. Gray introduced train-of-four monitoring, still used today. He also worked with Gordon Jackson Rees at Liverpool, developing safer methods for paediatric anaesthesia.

Cecil Gray made a great contribution to postgraduate education, organising the first "day-release" course in Britain for junior anaesthetists preparing for their examinations. The course attracted trainees from all over Europe, the Far East, the Middle East, Australia, Africa and India.

== Honours ==
A foundation member of Faculty of Anaesthetists of the Royal College of Surgeons of England in 1948, he served as vice-dean in 1952 and dean in 1964. Gray was the editor of the British Journal of Anaesthesia from 1948 to 1964. He was President of the Section of Anaesthetics of the Royal Society of Medicine in 1955 and the first anaesthetist to be awarded the Sir Arthur Sims Commonwealth Travelling Fellowship by the RCS (England). An active council member of the Association of Anaesthetists of Great Britain and Ireland, Gray served as treasurer and as president (1957–1959). In 1959, he was awarded a personal chair in anaesthesia at the University of Liverpool and was made Dean of the Faculty of Medicine in 1970, retiring in 1976, but continued to give occasional lectures.

Gray was appointed CBE in 1976 by Her Majesty Elizabeth II of the United Kingdom and in 1982 was honoured by Pope John Paul II with the membership of the Order of St. Gregory the Great as a Knight Commander. In 2007 the Liverpool Echo included him in its list of the 800 greatest Liverpudlians, as part of Liverpool's 800th anniversary.

== Private life ==
He married twice, his first wife was Marjorie Kathleen Hely in 1937, they had 2 children, and she died in 1978. He then married Pamela Mary Corning in 1979, with whom he had 1 son. He also had four grandchildren.

A requiem mass was held at Liverpool Metropolitan Cathedral on 26 January 2008.

== Publications ==
- Gray, T. Cecil; Halton, J. A. (1946). "A Milestone in Anæsthesia?: (d-Tubocurarine Chloride)". Proceedings of the Royal Society of Medicine. 39 (7): 400–10. doi:10.1177/003591574603900716. ISSN 0035-9157. PMC 2181758. PMID 19993317.
- Gray, T. Cecil; Nunn, J. F. (1971). General Anaesthesia (3rd ed.). London: Butterworths. ISBN 0-407-18554-2.
- Gray, T. Cecil (2002). Dr. Richard Formby. Royal College of Physicians. ISBN 1-86016-185-5.
