= BJA Education =

- Discipline: Anaesthesia
- Language: English
- Edited by: Jonathan Thompson

Publication details
- History: 2001–present
- Publisher: Elsevier
- Frequency: Bimonthly

Standard abbreviations
- ISO 4: BJA Educ.

Indexing
- ISSN: 1743-1816 (print); 1743-1824 (web)
- OCLC no.: 474834768

Links
- Journal homepage; Online access

BJA Education, formerly known as Continuing Education in Anaesthesia, Critical Care & Pain and BJA CEPD Reviews is a bimonthly peer-reviewed medical journal. Originally published by Oxford University Press, it is now published by Elsevier since 2018. It is a joint undertaking of the British Journal of Anaesthesia and the Royal College of Anaesthetists in collaboration with the Faculty of Pain Medicine, the College of Anaesthesiologists of Ireland, the Hong Kong College of Anaesthesiologists and the Faculty of Intensive Care Medicine. It publishes materials to support the continuing medical education and professional development of specialists in anaesthesia, critical care medicine, and pain management. The structured articles are commissioned and cover core knowledge, current controversies, and future trends, as well as suggestions for further reading, key points, and multiple choice questions.
