= John Gillies (anaesthetist) =

Scottish anaesthetist

John Gillies CVO, MC
- John Gillies. Detail from portrait by Stanley Cursiter.
- Born: 6 February 1895; Edinburgh, Scotland
- Died: 18 July 1976 (aged 81); Edinburgh, Scotland
- Education: Broughton School, Edinburgh; University of Edinburgh
- Occupation: Anaesthetist
- Known for: Gillies anaesthetic machine President of the Association of Anaesthetists; Textbook of Anaesthetics
- Spouse: Agnes McGilchrist Anderson
- Children: Four

John Gillies, CVO, MC, , FRCSE, FFARCS, FRCPE, , , (6 February 1895 – 18 July 1976) was a Scottish anaesthetist, who worked at the Royal Infirmary of Edinburgh (RIE). For gallantry as a serving soldier in WWI he was awarded the Military Cross. He founded the department of anaesthetics in the RIE and became its first director. The Gillies anaesthetic machine which he devised was the first British closed circuit anaesthetic device and was in use until the 1960s. With his colleague HWC ('Griff') Griffiths he pioneered the technique of high spinal anaesthesia to produce hypotension and 'bloodless' operating fields. Gillies anaesthetised King George VI in Buckingham Palace and was made Commander of the Royal Victorian Order (CVO) for this service. He was president of the Association of Anaesthetists of Great Britain and Ireland from 1947 to 1950.

== Early life ==
John Gillies was born in Edinburgh the son of Archibald George Gillies and his wife Jessie Jane Gillies. He was educated at Broughton High School, Edinburgh, going on to study medicine at the University of Edinburgh Medical School from 1913. At the outbreak of WWI he volunteered for army service and served in the British Expeditionary Force. He was commissioned in the Highland Light Infantry, was awarded the Military Cross and spent the last seven months of the war as a prisoner of war in Germany. He returned to Edinburgh and completed his medical studies, graduating MB ChB in 1923.

== Career ==
Gillies was a house physician in Cumberland Infirmary, Carlisle before entering general practice in the West Riding of Yorkshire. Much of his work involved giving anaesthetics for operations performed by one of his partners. To gain experience in this field he went to London in 1931 to study anaesthetic technique under Dr John Hunter and Dr (later Sir) Ivan Magill, a pioneer of endotracheal tube anaesthesia. The following year he returned to Edinburgh to work as an anaesthetist at the Royal Hospital for Sick Children. He was then appointed as anaesthetist to the Royal Infirmary of Edinburgh (RIE). Here he worked in the professorial surgical unit, initially with Sir John Fraser and subsequently with Sir James Learmonth and latterly with Sir John Bruce. In 1940 Gillies set up the Department of Anaesthetics in the RIE, the first such in Scotland with two junior anaesthetists whose training he supervised. When the National Health Service was established in 1948 he was appointed Director of Anaesthesia. He determined to make anaesthetics an academic discipline in Edinburgh and recommended that anaesthetists in the RIE should have university status. He was appointed lecturer in anaesthetics by the university. and was later promoted to J Y Simpson Reader in anaesthesia.

Among the contributions which he made was the invention of the Gillies anaesthetic machine, thought to be the first British closed circuit apparatus. The first commercial model was made by Charles King Ltd of London from 1941. A second improved version was available from 1948 and from 1951 the Mark III version was produced by the Coxeter–King division of the British Oxygen Company. The machine continued in use in Britain until the 1960s.

With his RIE anaesthetic colleague HWC Griffiths he popularised the technique of high spinal anaesthesia, which they had introduced to induce hypotension and to produce a 'bloodless' operating field.

Gillies, with RJ Minnitt, jointly wrote the sixth and seventh editions of Textbook of Anaesthetics.

in March 1949, Gillies anaesthetised King George VI for the operation of lumbar sympathectomy, performed in Buckingham Palace by his colleague Sir James Learmonth. It is likely that he gave the anaesthetic using his own Gillies machine.

He retired in 1960 and died in 1976.

== Honours and awards ==
For services in anaesthetising King George VI he was appointed Commander of the Royal Victorian Order (CVO). He was elected to numerous presidencies including president of the Association of Anaesthetists of Great Britain and Ireland from 1947 to 1950, president of the Scottish Society of Anaesthetists in 1950, President of the section of anaesthesia of the Royal Society of Medicine the following year and president of the Association of Anaesthetists of Edinburgh in 1952. He was awarded the Hickman Medal of the Royal Society of Medicine, the John Snow Medal of the Association of Anaesthetists and was H. J. Shields Lecturer at the University of Toronto. He was awarded the Gold Medal of the Canadian Anesthsiologists' Society. Uniquely for an anaesthetist he was awarded the Lister Victoria Jubilee Medal of the Royal College of Surgeons of Edinburgh.

== Family ==
Gillies married Agnes McGilchrist Anderson and they had four children.

== Legacy ==
In 1977 the Scottish Society of Anaesthetists established the Gillies Memorial Lecture in his memory.

== Selected publications ==
Gillies, J. (1941) Anaesthesia in the shocked patient. The Lancet, 237, 6129, 226–227.

Gillies, J. (1942). Modern anæsthesia. Edinburgh Post-Graduate Lectures in Medicine, 2, 1940–41.

Gillies, J. (1943). The Time Factor in Surgical Operations. Proceedings of the Royal Society of Medicine, 36, 9, 457–462.

Gillies, J. (1949). Anæsthesia for the Surgical Treatment of Hypertension. Proceedings of the Royal Society of Medicine, 42, 5, 295–298.

Gillies, J. (1952). Physiological Trespass in Anæsthesia: President's Address. Proceedings of the Royal Society of Medicine, 45, 1, 1–6.

Minnitt, R. J., Gillies, J. (1948). Textbook of Anaesthetics ... With a section on regional analgesia by L.B. Wevill, etc. Edinburgh: E. & S. Livingstone.
