= Suzanne Crowe =

Irish anaesthesiologist

- Education: Trinity College Dublin
- Occupations: Anaesthesiologist, intensivist
- Known for: Presidency of the Medical Council of Ireland

Suzanne Crowe is an Irish anaesthesiologist, intensivist, and current president of the Medical Council of Ireland.

== Background and education ==
Crowe is from Bray, County Wicklow. She obtained her medical degree from Trinity College Dublin (TCD) in 1995. She completed specialist training in anaesthesia and intensive care through the College of Anaesthesiologists of Ireland (CAI), followed by a fellowship at the Royal Children's Hospital in Melbourne, Australia. She became a Fellow of the Faculty of Anaesthetists of the Royal College of Surgeons in Ireland (FFARCSI) in 1999 and a Fellow of the Joint Faculty of Intensive Care Medicine of Ireland in 2006. She has a postgraduate diploma in Healthcare Management from the Institute of Public Administration/RCSI, and in Bereavement Studies from the Irish Hospice Foundation/RCSI.

== Medical career ==
In 2005, Crowe returned to Dublin where she was appointed as a consultant in anaesthesiology at Tallaght University Hospital. In 2006, she became a clinical lecturer in surgery at TCD. In 2014, she moved to Children's Health Ireland at Crumlin (CHI Crumlin), where she now works as a consultant in paediatric intensive care and anaesthesiology. In 2014, she was also appointed as senior clinical lecturer in paediatrics at TCD. In 2021, she was appointed Associate Clinical Professor in paediatrics at UCD. In 2017, Crowe became medical director of paediatric intensive care at CHI Crumlin. She is national clinical lead for paediatric organ donation. Crowe is a member of the National Paediatric Mortality Register, the Irish Paediatric Anaesthesia and Critical Care Society of Ireland, the Paediatric Intensive Care Society of UK and Ireland, and the European Society of Intensive Care Medicine. She has written over 50 peer-reviewed papers and book chapters. She has previously worked in private practice at the Blackrock Clinic, the Hermitage Medical Clinic and the Beacon Hospital in Dublin.

== Leadership roles ==
Professor Crowe has been a member of the Medical Council of Ireland since 2018. In 2021, Crowe she was elected president of the council for a three-year term. She is the youngest person to have held the role. She has also served as Medical Council representative on the Medical Intern Board of National Doctors Training and Planning and is a former Chair of the Medical Council Ethics Committee. She chaired the council's Ethics Working Group for the termination of pregnancy, speaking before the Oireachtas Joint Committee on Health on the matter. She is an advocate for patients, healthcare improvement and children's health and social services. Prof. Crowe is Chair of the National Screening Advisory Committee, which advises the Minister for Health on Population Screening. Crowe is a member of the National Women's Council of Ireland and a member of the Children's Rights Alliance. She is a director and trustee of Cheshire Ireland, LGBT Ireland and the Down Syndrome Centre.

== Personal life ==
Professor Crowe has four children. Her husband of twenty years, Barry Henry, an investment banker, died suddenly in 2019.

== Awards ==
Crowe has won several awards, including the 2000 Geraldine O'Sullivan Memorial Medal for Paediatric Anaesthesia and the 2018 Irish Healthcare Awards Research Paper of the Year.
