= Frankis =

Frankis is the name of:

- Frankis Carol (born 1987), Cuban handballer
- Frankis T. Evans FRCS (1900–1974), dean of the Royal College of Anaesthetists
- Gianni Frankis (born 1988), British-born Italian athlete

== See also ==
- Franchi (disambiguation)
