= Fellowship of the Royal College of Anaesthetists =

Postgraduate anaesthetic medical qualification in the UK

Fellowship of the Royal College of Anaesthetists (FRCA) is a postgraduate medical qualification in the United Kingdom awarded by the Royal College of Anaesthetists (RCoA) to doctors who have completed specialty training in anaesthetics. The exam comprises two parts, the Primary FRCA and the Final FRCA, which are sat at different stages of anaesthetic specialty training. Obtaining this qualification allows a doctor to become a fellow of the College, as well as entitling them to use the post-nominal letters FRCA (with continued payment of RCoA fees).

== History ==
The first postgraduate qualification in anaesthesia in the UK and the world was the Diploma in Anaesthesia (DA), established by the Association of Anaesthetists of Great Britain and Ireland in 1935. This was followed by an expansion in 1948 to the "two-part" DA by adding a primary examination of basic scientific knowledge; this was the result of responsibility for the DA being taken over by the Faculty of Anaesthetists of the Royal College of Surgeons of England as part of an effort to professionalise and enhance the status of the anaesthetic specialty following World War II, with the new two-part examination being administered by the Conjoint Board of the London Royal Colleges. Initially, fellowship of the new faculty (FFARCS) was only to be awarded by nomination to "those achieving distinction in the specialty", however in 1952 a route to FFARCS by examination was established, with the DA dropping back down to a subordinate one-part qualification and the FFARCS taking its place as the primary specialist anaesthetic qualification; the continued existence of the DA as a subordinate qualification was controversial. The eventual separation of the College from the RCS lead to the formation of the modern FRCA in the 1990s.

== Examinations ==
=== Primary FRCA ===
The Primary FRCA is an examination open to doctors who are registered with the RCoA as trainees in anaesthetics, intensive care medicine, or the Acute Care Common Stem core training. The exam is typically taken on completion of the first two years of core training in anaesthetics (either as part of the ACCS or core anaesthetic training) and consists of 3 main components: a Multiple Choice Question (MCQ) examination, an Objective Structured Clinical Examination (OSCE), and a Structured Oral Examination (SOE). The MQA consists of 90 single-best answer questions, consisting of 30 each of pharmacology, physiology, and physics, biostatistics, and biometrics; each question consists of a clinical vignette, followed by a question and five possible answers. Successful completion of the MQA allows the candidate to enter the OSCE, consisting of up to 16 stations where they must demonstrate a clinical skill or interpret data, and the SOE, consisting of an hour of viva oral examination, where the candidate is asked 3 questions each on pharmacology, physiology & biochemistry, clinical topics (including a critical incident), and physics, biostatistics, & biometrics. Successful competition of all aspects of the Primary FRCA is often required for advancement from Core Trainee to a Specialty Registrar post in anaesthetics, and allows the candidate to take the Final FRCA within the next 7 years.

=== Final FRCA ===
The final FRCA is the final examination open to doctors who are registered with the RCoA as trainees in anaesthetics and have completed the Final FRCA within the past 7 years. The exam is typically taken in the latter stages of specialty training in anaesthetics while holding a position as a Specialty Registrar, and consists of 2 main components: a written examination, and another SOE. The final written exam lasts three hours and consists of 90 single-best answer questions, consisting of 45 regarding general anaesthesia, 10 each on perioperative medicine and local anaesthesia, and 25 on other curriculum items, with each question again consisting of a clinical vignette followed by a question and five possible answers. Successful completion of the written exam allows the candidate to take the SOE, consisting of sections SOE1 and SOE2; SOE1 is further split into parts A and B, where each part consists of two short clinical cases with attached clinical science questions, whereas SOE2 consists of two long clinical cases and two short clinical cases.

=== Future ===
Following an independent review of the FRCA examinations in 2023, the RCoA is in the process of implementing a new system of testing which will replace the current exam components in 2027. Both the Primary MCQ and the Final Written Exam will be replaced with single-best answer Applied Knowledge Tests, the Primary OSCE and SOE will be replaced with a new Clinical Anaesthetic Sciences Exam (CASE) circuit of stations, and the Final SOE will be replaced with a similar Final Clinical Performance Exam (FCPE) station circuit.

== Fellowship ==
Those who pass the examination are admitted as Fellows of the Royal College of Anaesthetists, and are entitled to use the postnominal "FRCA" after their name. Fellowship may also be bestowed by election from the Council of the College. A ceremony is held annually in London at which new fellows are formally admitted. "Diplomates" are invited to attend, but are admitted as fellows whether or not they do so.

== See also ==
- Association of Anaesthetists of Great Britain and Ireland
- Fellowship of the College of Anaesthesiologists of Ireland (FCAI)
- Fellowship of the Australian and New Zealand College of Anaesthetists (FANZCA)
- European Diploma in Anaesthesiology and Intensive Care (EDAIC)
- Fellowship of the College of Anaesthetists of the Colleges of Medicine of South Africa. (FCA (SA))
