= William Wylie =

William Wylie may refer to:

- William Campbell Wylie (1905–1992), New Zealand-born Chief Justice of Borneo
- W. Derek Wylie (1918–1998), British physician, dean of the Royal College of Anaesthetists
- William Duncan Wylie (1900–1981), Canadian politician, farmer, public servant and federal
- William Howie Wylie (1833–1891), Scottish journalist and Baptist minister
- William M. Wylie (1928–2006), U.S. politician, farmer, and businessman from Nebraska

== See also ==
- Bill Martin (songwriter) (1938–2020), Scottish songwriter, real name William Wylie MacPherson
- William Wylie Galt (1919–1944), United States Army officer and Medal of Honor recipient
