= Franchino =

Franchino is a surname. Notable people with the surname include:

- Fabio Franchino (born 1969), Italian political scientist
- Joe Franchino (born 1976), American former soccer player

== See also ==
- Franchino (disc jockey) (1953-2024), Italian disc jockey
- Franchi (disambiguation)
