= Besouw =

Besouw is a surname. Notable people with the surname include:

- J. P. van Besouw, president of the Royal College of Anaesthetists
- Kristania Virginia Besouw (born 1985), Miss Indonesia 2006
