= Bernard Johnson =

Bernard Johnson may refer to:

- Bernard Johnson (organist), English organist and composer
- Bernard Johnson (anaesthetist), English anaesthestist and dean of the Royal College of Anaesthetists
- B. J. Johnson (swimmer) (Bernard Henry Johnson), American swimmer
- Barney Johnson (Bernard Stafford Johnson), horticulturalist and television gardener in Ireland
- Bernard Johnson, survivor of the 1967 Lake Erie skydiving disaster

== See also ==
- Bernard Johnson Coliseum, a multi-purpose arena at Sam Houston State University in Huntsville, Texas
