= BJA =

BJA may refer to:

- Billie Joe Armstrong (born 1972), American musician, frontman of the band Green Day
- Brian Jordan Alvarez (born 1987), American actor
- British Journal of Anaesthesia
- British Judo Association
- Bureau of Justice Assistance, located under the U.S. Department of Justice (DOJ)
