= Peter Nightingale =

Peter Nightingale may refer to:

- Petrus de Dacia (mathematician) (13th century), called Peter Nightingale
- Peter Nightingale (physician), president of the Royal College of Anaesthetists from 2009 to 2012
