= Peter Hutton =

Peter Hutton may refer to:

- Peter Hutton (filmmaker) (1944–2016), experimental filmmaker
- Peter Hutton (priest) (1811–1880), English Roman Catholic priest and headmaster
- Peter Hutton (footballer) (born 1973), Northern Irish football coach and former player
- Peter Hutton (media executive) (born 1966), English sports media executive and former commentator
- Peter Hutton (anaesthetist), president of the Royal College of Anaesthetists
