= Archie Brain =

British anaesthetist

Archie I J Brain
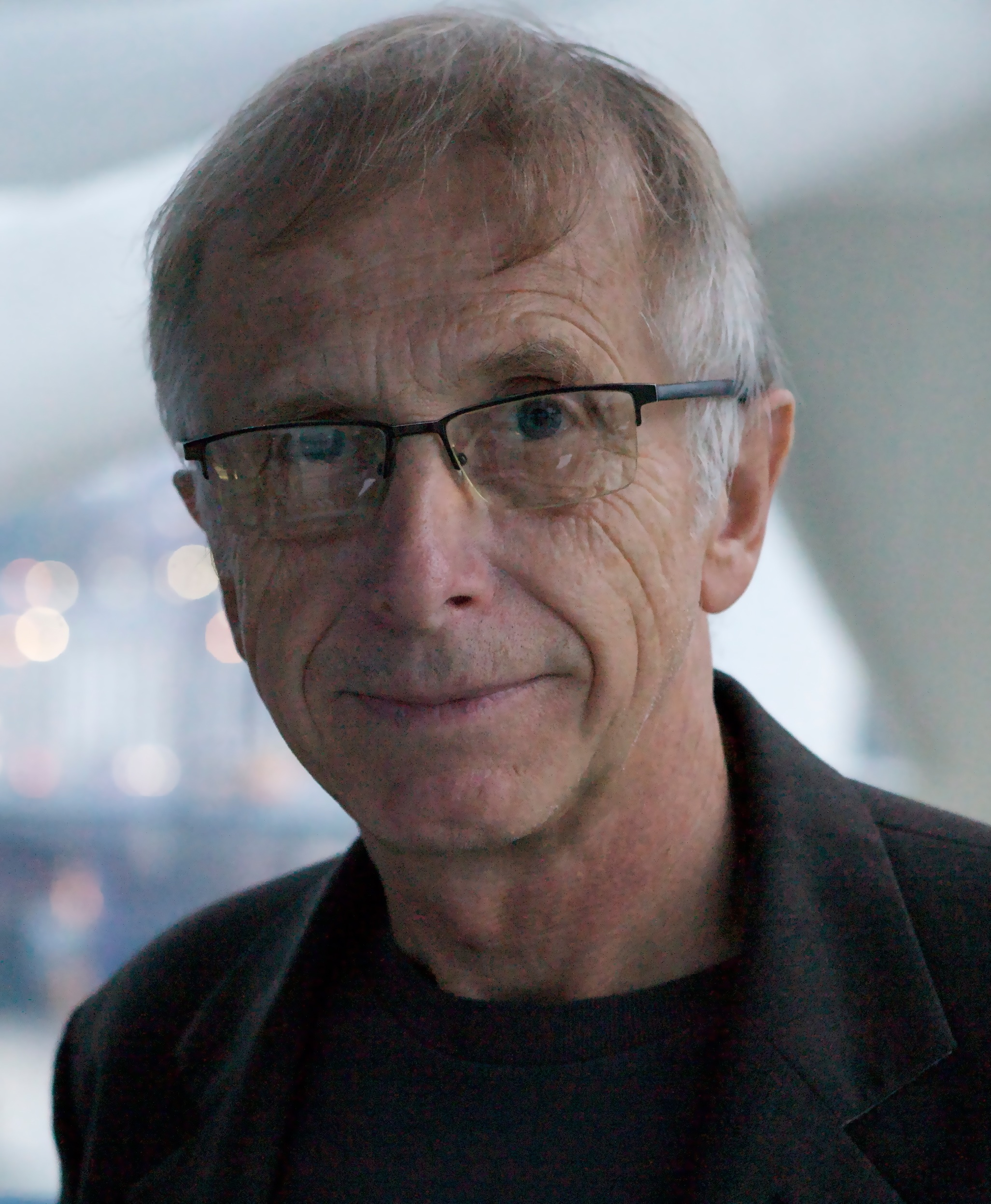
- Brain in 2009
- Born: 2 July 1942 (age 84); Kobe, Japan
- Education: Worcester College, Oxford; St Bartholomew's Hospital Medical College
- Known for: Inventor of laryngeal mask airway
- Scientific career
- Fields: Anaesthesia

Archie Brain (born 2 July 1942) is a British anaesthetist best known as the inventor of the laryngeal mask (LMA). The LMA has been used over 300 million times worldwide in elective anaesthesia and emergency airway management.

== Early life and education ==
Brain was born in Kobe, Japan, on 2 July 1942, to British diplomatic parents. He was educated in Singapore, Japan and England before receiving a scholarship to Worcester College, Oxford, where he initially studied French and Spanish.

After completing his degree, he undertook preclinical medical studies at the Radcliffe Infirmary in Oxford and clinical training at St Bartholomew's Hospital in London, qualifying in 1970. He began training in anaesthesia at the Royal East Sussex Hospital in 1971 and obtained a Diploma in Anaesthetics in 1972. Brain became a Fellow of the Faculty of Anaesthetists of the Royal College of Surgeons in Ireland in 1977.

== Career ==
Brain returned to the UK in April 1980 and took up a post as a lecturer at the Royal London Hospital under Professor Jimmy Payne. His early research included experiments on the use of electromagnetic induction to inhibit nerve conduction and a 1982 publication on rapid anaesthetic induction for caesarean section.

=== Development of the laryngeal mask airway ===
In 1981, while working as a lecturer in anaesthetics at the London Hospital, Brain began developing an airway device intended to provide a hands-free alternative to a face mask while avoiding some of the complications associated with tracheal intubation. His early prototypes used the inflatable cuff of a Goldman dental nasal mask, which he modified to fit around the laryngeal inlet.

Brain first used a handmade prototype clinically in 1981 and conducted a pilot study involving 23 patients the following year. He published the first clinical description of the device in 1983.

After several years of further development and clinical testing, the LMA Classic entered commercial use in the United Kingdom in 1988. Brain later developed specialised versions of the device, including the LMA Flexible, Intubating Laryngeal Mask Airway, LMA ProSeal and LMA Supreme.

Before developing the laryngeal mask airway, Brain had submitted patent applications for several other medical devices. He submitted a patent application for the laryngeal mask airway in 1982.

He became a consultant to LMA International in 2005 and retired from the position in December 2010.

== Honours and awards ==
- Dudley Buxton Prize from the Royal College of Anaesthetists (1995).
- Honorary Fellow of the Royal College of Anaesthetists (1995).
- Honorary Fellow of the Australian and New Zealand College of Anaesthetists (2001).
- Medical Futures Lifetime Achievement Award (2007).
- DAS Macewen Medal from the Difficult Airway Society (2011).
