= Hulf =

Hulf is a surname. Notable people with the surname include:

- Judith Hulf (born 1945), British anaesthetist
- Isobel Pollock-Hulf (born 1954), British academic

== See also ==
- Huff (surname)
