= Laryngeal mask airway =

Medical device for maintaining an open airway

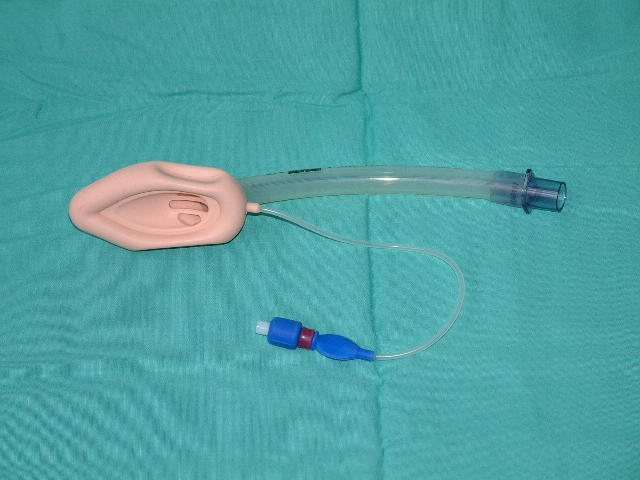
- A laryngeal mask
- Specialty: Anesthesiology, emergency medicine

A laryngeal mask airway (LMA), also known as laryngeal mask, is a medical device that keeps a patient's airway open during anaesthesia or while they are unconscious. It is a type of supraglottic airway device. They are most commonly used by anaesthetists to channel oxygen or inhalational anaesthetic to the lungs during surgery and in the pre-hospital setting (for instance by paramedics and emergency medical technicians) for unconscious patients.

A laryngeal mask is composed of an airway tube that connects to an elliptical mask with a cuff which is inserted through the patient's mouth, down the windpipe, and once deployed, forms an airtight seal on top the glottis (unlike tracheal tubes which pass through the glottis) allowing a secure airway to be managed by a health care provider.

The laryngeal mask was invented by British anaesthesiologist Archibald Brain in the early 1980s, and in December 1987 the first commercial laryngeal mask was made available in the United Kingdom. The laryngeal mask is still widely used today worldwide, and a variety of specialised laryngeal masks exist.

== Uses ==
It channels oxygen and inhalational anaesthetic to the lungs. It can be used during anaesthesia, or while a patient is unconscious. Laryngeal mask airways are designed to be an easy way to secure the airway and ventilate a patient – they are easier to place than tracheal intubation due to the lack of muscle relaxants and laryngoscopy. They are also less likely to damage teeth or the larynx itself. It may form an air-tight seal. Cuffs are available in multiple sizes.

LMAs can be alternatives to the use of a face mask when using a bag-valve-mask device to prevent gastric insufflation.

== Contraindications ==
A laryngeal mask airway is generally not used in surgeries where there is a high risk that stomach contents may be aspirated. This is particularly for surgeries that last longer than 2 hours. It often uses low inflation pressures, so may not be appropriate in patients with illnesses that cause low lung compliance. As it is typically larger and more obstructive than tracheal intubation, it is generally not used for surgery of the mouth and throat.

It is not used for conscious patients because of the risk of stimulating the gag reflex.

== Complications ==
A laryngeal mask leaves more anatomical dead space in the trachea than with tracheal intubation. This can decrease the oxygenation of the lungs and the removal of carbon dioxide. It also slightly increases airway resistance. More serious complications include vomiting while the laryngeal mask airway is in place (potentially leading to aspiration of stomach contents).

Although the laryngeal mask airway is specifically designed to be easy to place, it is possible for the ventilation it provides to be inadequate. This may be due to variations in neck anatomy, abnormal neck position, dislodgement of the cuff, the mask not being long enough to reach the larynx (or more rarely too long), or folding of the mask in the pharynx. For these reasons, radiology can be used to ensure that the laryngeal mask airway is in the correct position.

== Technique ==
A laryngeal mask airway has an airway tube that connects to an elliptical mask with a cuff. The cuff can either be an inflating type (achieved after insertion using a syringe of air), or self-sealing.

A laryngeal mask airway is first completely sterilised (it may be reused many times). Standard checks for common use defects are performed (such as cracks in the plastic). For an inflatable cuff, the cuff is inflated and deflated outside the patient to ensure it is functional. A pen-like grip is used to move it through the patient's mouth and throat, preferably when their head is extended to straighten the airway. The laryngeal mask airway is lubricated so that it can be placed more easily.

Once inserted correctly (and the cuff inflated where relevant), the mask conforms to the anatomy with the bowl of the mask facing the space between the vocal cords. The tip of the laryngeal mask sits in the throat against the upper oesophageal sphincter.

== History ==
=== Concept ===
Archie Brain began studying the anatomy and physiology of the upper airway in relation to existing airways. Brain concluded that current techniques for connecting artificial airways to the patient were not ideal. He reasoned that if the respiratory tree is seen as a tube ending at the glottis and the objective is to connect this tube to an artificial airway, the most logical solution was to create a direct end-to-end junction. Existing airway devices failed to form this junction; the face-mask sealed against the face, and the endotracheal tube penetrated too far so that the junction was created within the trachea, instead of at its beginning.

=== First study ===
The first study of a laryngeal mask in 23 patients was conducted at London Hospital in 1982. Insertion and ventilation using the laryngeal mask in 16 anaesthetised, paralysed female patients was successful, achieving a seal greater than 20 cm H_{2}O in all patients. Emergence from anaesthesia was also noted to be uneventful and three patients complained of a sore throat, a contrast to endotracheal tube anaesthesia. Following the success of the initial study, Brain successfully inserted and ventilated six anaesthetised, non-paralysed patients. Finding no difference between the first and second group of patients, the study found that muscle relaxation was not required for insertion. Finally, Brain used the device in a dental extraction patient, and observed that because the space in and around the glottis was filled by the mask, the need for packing was much reduced and the larynx was completely protected from surgical debris. Brain believed that the laryngeal mask could be applied to head and neck surgery and also observed that "In two patients the anatomy was such as to suggest that endotracheal intubation might have presented at least moderate difficulty. Neither presented difficulty with regard to insertion of the laryngeal mask ". By 1985, experience with the laryngeal mask prototype had reached 4,000 cases. Brain published a case series in Anaesthesia in 1985 describing the management of three difficult airway patients, illustrating the use of the laryngeal mask for airway rescue. Brain with five co-authors published a second paper in anaesthesia describing the use of the laryngeal mask in over 500 patients, adding considerable credence to the laryngeal mask concept. However the limitation of the prototypes remained, a new material was needed.

=== Search for new material ===
Following the realisation that a new material was needed, Brain looked at a number of options; polyvinyl chloride was too rigid and synthetic foam did not lend itself to re-use. Silicone prototypes looked promising as what was produced was an ellipse with a flat central web which, if cut correctly, could be used to create an aperture bar to prevent the epiglottis falling into the distal aperture. The silicone prototype was also smooth and deflated into a wafer thin ellipse, however, the silicone mask was unable to retain the desired bowl shape and it was no longer possible to make rapid adjustments to the design. The silicone Dunlop prototype was superior to the Goldman prototype, one of Brain's first prototypes created from the cuff of a latex Goldman dental mask, however Brain needed a material that would give him design flexibility before the next set of silicone moulds were cast. In 1986, Brain continued to make prototypes from latex with a range of modifications; the inclusion of an inflation line, a thin-walled elliptical ring in the cuff which resulted in equal expansion of the cuff, the creation of a larger size to increase the reliability of cuff seal pressure and a moulded back plate for the cuff. By December 1986, Brain was ready to conduct the first wholly independent trial and chose John Nunn to be the recipient of the silicone prototypes to conduct the trial. "There were three outstanding advantages of the LMA in patients who breathed spontaneously. Firstly, excellent airway patency was obtained in 98% of patients and did not deteriorate during the course of the anaesthetic. Secondly, as no manual support of the jaw was necessary the hands of the anaesthetist were freed for monitoring, record keeping and other tasks. Thirdly, it was possible to maintain a clear airway throughout transfer of the patient to the recovery room." The publication of this trial in 1989 was critical in kickstarting the uptake of the laryngeal mask in the UK".

=== First commercial laryngeal mask ===
On 5 December 1987, Brain received the first case of all-factory-made, silicone cuffed, LMA Classic laryngeal mask distributed by The Laryngeal Mask Company Limited. The LMA Classic was launched in the UK and the British anaesthesia community were quick to realise the potential benefits of the laryngeal mask. Within three years of launch in the UK, the device had been used in at least two million patients and was available in every hospital. By 1992, the laryngeal mask was approved for sale and being sold in Australia, New Zealand, South Korea, Hong Kong, Taiwan, Malaysia, India and the United States. The anaesthesia community had been calling for practice guidelines and in 1992 the ASA commissioned a task force to establish practice guidelines for managing difficult airway situations. The ASA algorithm for difficult airways was published in 1993 and stressed an early attempt at insertion of the laryngeal mask if face mask ventilation was not adequate. The laryngeal mask revolutionised anaesthetic practice and by 1995 had been used in excess of 100 million patients and was available in more than 80 countries throughout the world. The laryngeal mask had now been widely accepted as a form of airway management. From 1988 to 2017, more than 200 million patients used laryngeal mask.

Between 1989 and 2000 a variety of specialised laryngeal masks were released which included the LMA Flexible (1990), LMA Fastrach (1997), LMA Unique (1997) and LMA ProSeal (2000), all offered by The Laryngeal Mask Company.

== See also ==
- Tracheal intubation
- Combitube
