= Michael Rosen (disambiguation) =

Michael Rosen (born 1946) is an English children's author and poet.

Michael Rosen may also refer to:

- Michael Rosen (mathematician) (born 1938), American mathematician
- Mike Rosen (born 1944), American talk radio show host
- Michael Rosen (rabbi) (1945–2008), Israeli rabbi
- Michael E. Rosen (born 1952), British philosopher and critic
- Michael J. Rosen (born 1954), American writer
- Michael Rosen (enterprise architect) (born 1956), American enterprise architect
- Michael Rosen (anaesthetist) (1927–2018), president of the (British) Royal College of Anaesthetists
- Michael Rosen, former head chef of Signatures, Washington, D.C.
- Michael Rosen, guitarist and trumpeter in English 1970s band Mogul Thrash

== See also ==
- Michael Rose (disambiguation)
