= Liam Brennan =

British anaesthetist

Liam Brennan is a consultant anaesthetist, deputy medical director of Cambridge University Hospitals NHS Foundation Trust, and chair of the Centre for Perioperative Care. He was formerly president of the Royal College of Anaesthetists from 2015 to 2018. He specialises in anaesthesia in children and those with difficult airways and in plastic surgery. As vice chair of the Academy of Medical Royal Colleges, he has a significant role in quality improvement and Brexit issues. Brennan has in addition been editor of the British Journal of Anaesthesia.
