= Scurr =

Scurr is a surname of Scandinavian origin. It is derived from the common Old Norse personal name Skorri. Notable people by that name include:

- Ruth Scurr, British writer, historian and literary critic.
- John Scurr (1876–1932), English Labour Party politician and trade union official.
- Cyril F. Scurr (1920–2012), dean of the Royal College of Anaesthetists.
- Julia Scurr (1871–1927), British politician.
