= Donald Campbell (anaesthetist) =

Scottish anaesthetist and medical dean

Sir Donald Campbell CBE FRCA FRCS FRCSE FRCPGlas FRCPE (8 March 1930 – 14 September 2004) was a Scottish anesthetist and the dean of the Royal College of Anaesthetists from 1982–85.

A native of Rutherglen, he was awarded a CBE in the 1987 Birthday Honours and knighted in the 1994 New Year Honours for services to medicine. In 1994 he was also elected a member of the Harveian Society of Edinburgh.
