= Alberto Arnoldi =

Italian sculptor and architect

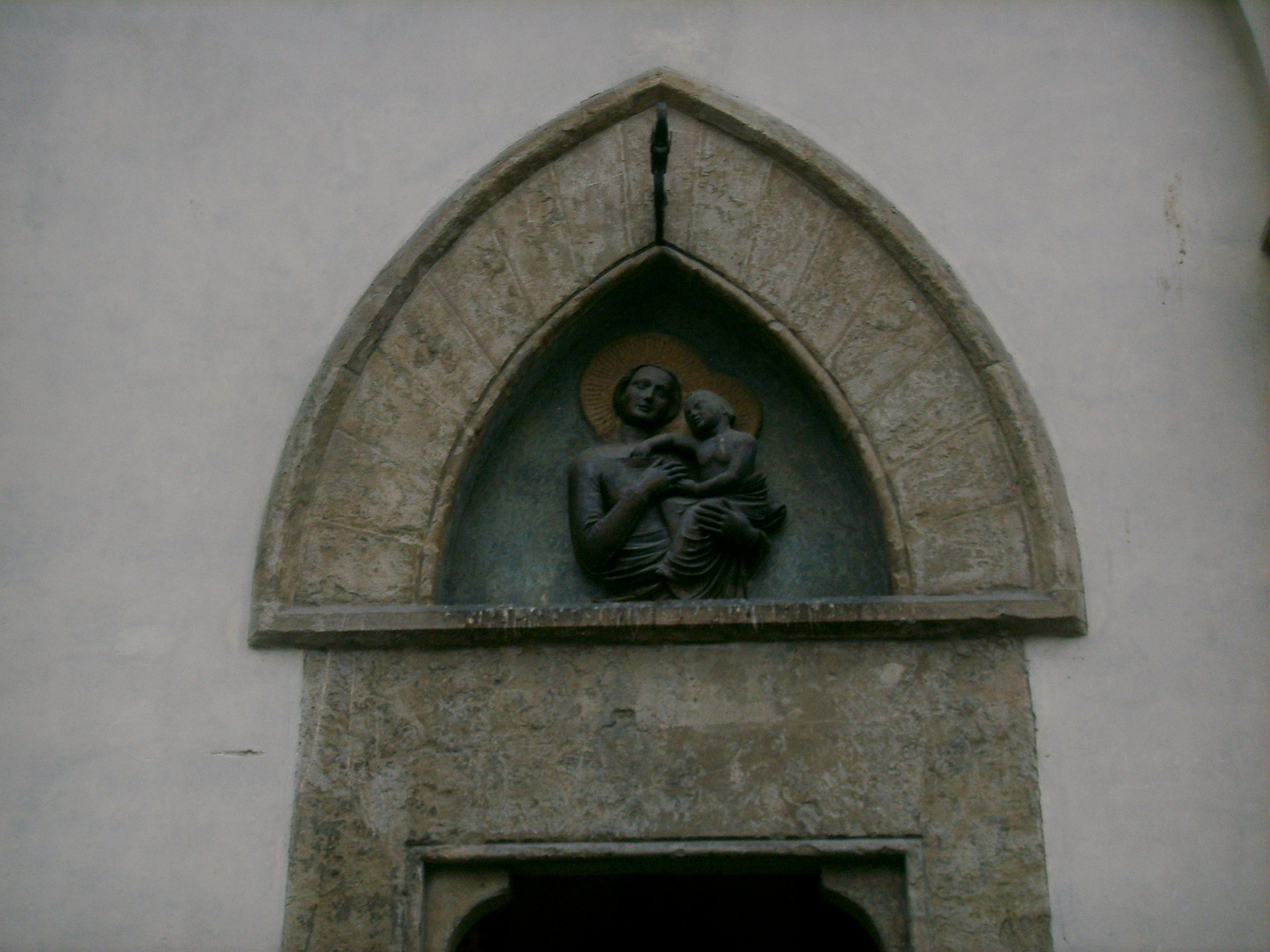
Loggia del Bigallo, Florence; sculpture attributed to Alberto Arnoldi

Alberto Arnoldi (or di Arnoldo) was a 14th-century Italian sculptor and architect. He was born in Florence. He was active from 1351 through 1364.

In 1364, he made the colossal group of the Madonna and Child with two angels (originally attributed by an error of Giorgio Vasari to Andrea Pisano) for the Loggia del Bigallo in Florence. Arnoldi worked at this group from 1359 to 1364. As architect, he directed the works of Florence Cathedral about 1358. The Museo dell'Opera del Duomo houses a marble relief from the base of the Florentine bell tower depicting the baptism attributed to Arnoldi. The date of the work is determined to be around 1375.

An example of his sculpture is in the Victoria and Albert Museum.

== Bibliography ==
- Leopoldo Cicognara, Storia della scultura
