= Geoffrey Organe =

British anaesthetist (1908–1989)

Sir Geoffrey Stephen William Organe FRCS (25 December 1908 – 7 January 1989) was an English anaesthetist and the dean of the Royal College of Anaesthetists from 1958 to 1961.
