= Rossello di Jacopo Franchi =

Florentine Renaissance painter

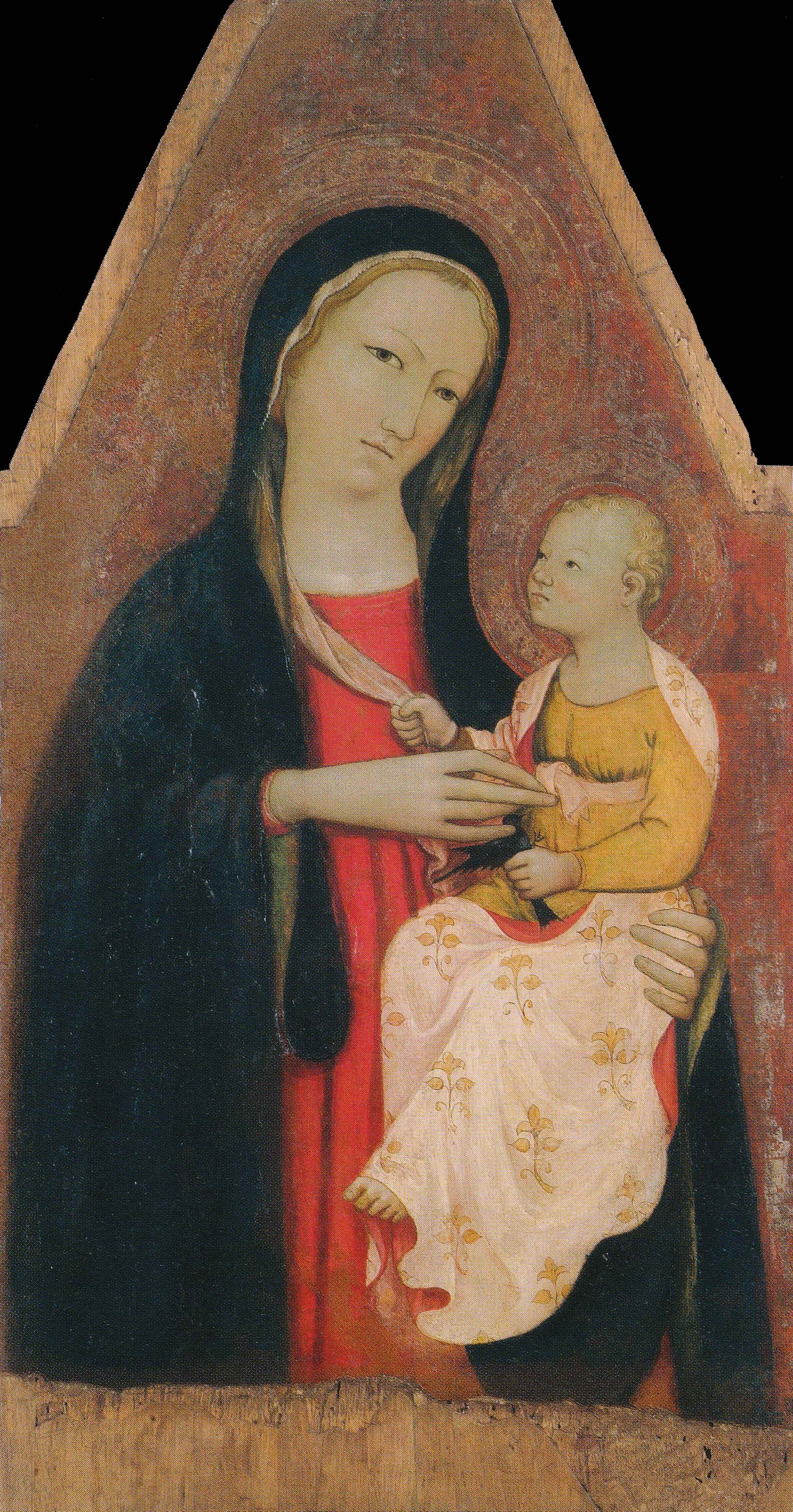
Rossello di Jacopo Franchi, Madonna and Child, 1410-1420, Tavarnelle Val di Pesa

Rossello di Jacopo Franchi (c. 1376/77 – c. 1456) was a Florentine Renaissance painter, active from about 1408 until 1451.

== Life ==
=== Personal life ===
Rossello di Jacopo Franchi was born in the year 1376 or 1377. He was most likely the son of Jacopo del Rosso and Catherine. His father and older brother, Nanni, both worked in the textile industry, as a wool-carder and a cloth cutter, respectively. Therefore, his entry into the arts was unexpected. The same can be said of Rossello's younger brother, Giunta, who was also a painter. There is some speculation that there may have been ties to the Arte de Medici e Speziali through a relative. From what scholars have discerned, Rossello's life was that of a hardworking craftsman, with some assets and land, who was dealt his fair share of family troubles and frustrations with his children.

Based on documents, it is presumed that Rossello's father died sometime between 1409 and 1416. However, Rossello himself was married by 1408 and had seven children, four of whom died in 1424 due to a stomach disorder. Two years later, in 1426, his first wife also died and was buried with her children at the family's parish church, S. Romolo. One year later he remarried to Mona Margherita, the sister of printmaker Giovanni di Piero di Bartolo Landi. Mona Margherita was married off with a dowry of 145 fiorini. Although the two did not have any children, three children from Rossello's previous marriage lived with them: Scolaio, Gismirante, and Palia.

Rossello died on 10 August 1456, and was buried in the Basilica of San Lorenzo, Florence. His testament, from 1450, declares that his estate was to be divided equally among his grandsons, Giovanni and Giunta, and any other legitimate children of Gismirante. In the event that any of his heirs had an untimely death, half of the estate was to be given to the S. Maria Nuovo and the other half to the Compagnia del Bigallo. Three gold fiorinis were also to be given to these institutions. Rossello's codicil was added six years later and was finished only four days before his death. The codicil served to elaborate on restrictions for his heirs. These restrictions came from Rossello's irritation towards his son regarding poor business dealings. Rossello died just four days after the codicil was finished, and his second wife, Mona, died fifteen months after him.

=== Professional life ===
Rossello di Jacopo Franchi, whose life spanned 80 years, was actively working in the arts from at least 1404 to 1451. He was trained at the Bigallo, a major institution in Florence, Italy. He mainly painted panels and frescoes, which comprise 27 of his 29 known works. He is also documented twice as an illuminator of manuscripts, although he is never referred to as a miniaturist. The first payment made to him by the Bigallo was in 1426 for minor work, which may have included minor repairs of the decorative theme in the oratory. The first record of Rossello doing an illumination was when he painted figures in a miniature of the Company's antiphonary. The only other documented time Rossello did an illumination is from 1429 at S. Stefano on a Prato gradual, which he was paid for. From this one miniature, eleven more have been attributed to him. However, the miniatures are often seen as supplementary works because his true focus was on panels and frescoes. The third documented commission from the Bigallo was for frescoes of the Company's patron and founder, Peter Martyr. This commission was undertaken with Ventura di Moro. The painting was done in the two western mezzanine bays of the north facade of the building's oratory and has remained there since. Throughout his time at the Compagnia del Bigallo, Rossello's relationship with the Bigallo took several forms: that of a renter, of a guarantor, of a debtor and of a commissioned artist.

The Bigallo frescoes and the miniatures in the Prato gradual are the basis for the rest of Rossello's works because they are the only two that are signed by Rossello and have complete documentation that includes Rossello's name. The rest of his 28 works have been attributed to him based on stylistic features and documentation which lack his name but where the timing lines up within his life.

Rossello's artistic style evolved through internal development, influences of other artists, and through temporal fashions. Rossello is well known for his drapery aesthetic because of his attention to detail and because he includes drapery in most of his paintings. His pieces are recognizable because he was an artist concerned with the minute details of his works. When painting panels, he often used careful techniques that would visually soften the major figures in the paintings. Rossello was excellent at blending colours to the point where his paintings looked almost like relief sculptures. He also used dimensionality in his works. They were typically symmetrical and balanced in ways that defied the inherent flatness of his working surface. In addition, Rossello favoured delicate colours, an attribute that distinguishes him as being influenced by Lorenzo Monaco. Rossello also embellished his works with jewels, fur-lined garments and other fashions of the time. However, his paintings were never regarded as frivolous, but had more of a richness and debonair quality to them. Stylistically, Rossello di Jacopo Franchi evolved with time but remained true to the details of his work and created a definable style for himself.

== Works ==
The earliest work ascribed to Rossello di Jacopo Franchi was a painting of Saint Blaise commissioned in 1408 by Niccolo di Francesco Falcucci, a well-known physician. This composition showcased Rossello's early individual style and was constructed very rigidly and systematically. Rossello's St. Blaise painting was a traditional Florentine painting of a saint who is frontally seated. It is not an innovative painting in form or design. The Saint is enthroned on a gold-embossed pillow before a richly embroidered cloth of honour held by two angels, a type familiar from Trecento painting. Some stylistic features, such as the tiny head with a slender, elongated body indicates the influence of Lorenzo Monaco and Lorenzo Ghiberti.
