= Michael Rose =

Michael Rose may refer to:

== Military ==
- Sir Michael Rose (British Army officer) (born 1940), British general
- Gary M. Rose (born 1947), retired American Army officer

== Music ==
- Michael Alec Rose (born 1959), American composer
- Michael Rose (singer) (born 1957), Jamaican reggae singer
  - Michael Rose (album)
- Mike Rose, one half of the songwriting/production duo Dufflebag Boys or Rose and Foster

== Sportspeople ==
=== Football ===
- Michael Rose (cricketer) (born 1942), English cricketer
- Michael Rose (footballer, born 1982), English footballer
- Michael Rose (footballer, born 1995), Scottish footballer
- Mike Rose (American football), American football linebacker
- Mike Rose (Canadian football) (born 1992), Canadian football defensive lineman

=== Other sports ===
- Mike Rose (baseball) (born 1976), American baseball player
- Mike Rose (basketball) (born 1987), American basketball player

== Other people ==
- Michael Rose (film producer) (born 1961), British film producer
- Michael Rose (lawyer), Australian lawyer and director, chancellor of the University of Technology Sydney from December 2025
- Michael E. Rose (born 1954), Canadian author
- Michael R. Rose (born 1955), evolutionary biologist
- Mike Rose (educator) (1944–2021), American educator
- Mike Rose (painter) (1932–2006), German painter, set designer and writer

== Fictional characters ==
- Michael Rose (EastEnders), character in the British TV series Eastenders

== See also ==
- Michael Rosen (disambiguation)
