= Gordon Jackson Rees =

British anaesthesiologist (1918-2001)

Gordon Jackson Rees (8 December 1918 – 19 January 2001) was a British anesthesiologist, recognized as a pioneer in pediatric anesthesia.

== Early life and education ==
Gordon Jackson Rees was born at Oswestry, Shropshire, the younger son of Thomas Archibald Rees and Ethel Jackson Rees. His father was a marine engineer in the Royal Naval Reserve. He studied medicine at the University of Liverpool. During World War II Rees served in the medical branch of the Royal Air Force, and was stationed in Freetown, Sierra Leone from 1943 to 1945. After the war, he pursued further study in anesthetics, earning his diploma in 1946.

== Career ==
Rees worked at the Royal Southern Teaching Hospital in Liverpool, where he worked with Thomas Cecil Gray and senior surgeon Isabella Forshall in advancing the safety and effectiveness of anesthesia, especially for children. Rees was a consultant at five hospitals, but over time began to focus exclusively on pediatric anesthesiology.

In 1950, he published an important early paper on anesthesia in neonatal surgery. "The time has come to consider the problem of anaesthetizing the newborn in relation to their peculiar physiology," he asserted, and proceeded to consider that problem for the rest of his career. Rees introduced several practices now standard in managing anesthesia in young patients, including premedication, endotracheal intubation, and muscle relaxants.

Rees' work was recognized with a Joseph Clover Medal and a Frederick Hewitt Medal, both from the Royal College of Surgeons of England; he also received the John Snow Medal from the Association of Anaesthetists of Great Britain, and the Robert M. Smith Award from the American Academy of Pediatrics. He was a fellow of many professional organizations, and served a term (1976-1979) as president of the Association of Paediatric Anaesthetists of Great Britain and Ireland; in 1986 he was appointed first president of the Federation of European Associations of Paediatric Anaesthesia.

Rees retired from practicing anaesthesia in 1983; in retirement he was a guest professor at Erasmus University Rotterdam for a year. In 1997 he gave a series of video interviews to a medical history researcher at Oxford Brookes University.

== Personal life ==
Gordon Jackson Rees married Betty Schofield in January 1943, while both were in medical school. They had four children. The astronomer Martin Rees is Gordon Jackson Rees' nephew.

Gordon Jackson Rees died in early 2001, age 82. The Jackson Rees Department of Anesthesia at the Royal Liverpool Children's Hospital is named in his honor. A piece of equipment known as the Jackson-Rees breathing circuit is still sold by medical supply companies.

== A note about his name ==
Gordon Jackson Rees was called "Jack" by friends and colleagues, and his academic articles were credited to "G. J. Rees", which would indicate that he treated Jackson a second forename (or as a middle name). However, he is sometimes referred to as "Jackson Rees", or the hyphenated "Jackson-Rees", in contexts that generally use surnames (such as the medical equipment named for him).
