= Ravi Mahajan =

Ravi Prakash Mahajan of the Nottingham University Hospitals NHS Trust and Queen's Medical Centre, Nottingham, was president of the Royal College of Anaesthetists in 2018–21.

He was appointed Commander of the Order of the British Empire (CBE) in the 2022 New Year Honours for services to anaesthesia.
