= Aileen Adams =

British consultant anaesthetist (born 1923)

Aileen Adams CBE FRCS FRCA
- Born: Aileen Kirkpatrick Adams; 5 September 1923 (age 102)
- Education: University of Sheffield
- Occupation: Consultant anaesthetist
- Employers: Addenbrooke's Hospital; Cambridge University

Aileen Kirkpatrick Adams (born 5 September 1923) is a British retired consultant anaesthetist. She turned 100 in September 2023.

== Early life ==
Aileen Adams was born on 5 September 1923. She graduated from the University of Sheffield.

== Career ==
Adams worked as a junior anaesthetist at Addenbrooke's Hospital from 1946 to 1951; as a senior registrar in Bristol from 1952 to 1955; a fellow in anaesthesia at Massachusetts General Hospital from 1955 to 1957; as a locum consultant in Oxford from 1958 to 1959; as a senior lecturer at Lagos University Medical School from 1963 to 1964, and was appointed a consultant anaesthetist back at Addenbrooke' from 1960 to 1984.

She was also an associate lecturer at Cambridge University from 1967 to 1984.

She was dean of the Faculty of Anaesthetists of the Royal College of Surgeons (later the Royal College of Anaesthetists) from 1985 to 1988.

== History of medicine ==
She served as president of the History of Anaesthesia Society from 1990 to 1992, of the History of Medicine Society of the Royal Society of Medicine from 1994 to 1995; and of the British Society for the History of Medicine from 2003 to 2005.

== Honours ==
She was made a Commander of the Order of the British Empire (CBE), and elected a Fellow of the Royal College of Surgeons (FRCS) and a Fellow of the Royal College of Anaesthetists (FRCA).

== Interviews ==
Adams, Aileen; Blythe, Max (1996). "Dr Aileen K Adams CBE FRCA in interview with Dr Max Blythe: Interview 1, Part 1" (Interview). Oxford Brookes University. doi:10.24384/000016.

Adams, Aileen; Blythe, Max (1996). "Dr Aileen K Adams CBE FRCA in interview with Dr Max Blythe: Interview 1, Part 2" (Interview). Oxford Brookes University. doi:10.24384/000017.

Adams, Aileen; Blythe, Max (2001). "Dr Aileen K Adams CBE FRCA in interview with Dr Max Blythe: Interview 2" (Interview). Oxford Brookes University. doi:10.24384/000018.
