= J. Edmund Riding =

British anaesthetist

John Edmund Riding CBE (1924–2018) was a British anaesthetist who served as the dean of the Royal College of Anaesthetists from 1976–79. He held a consultant appointment to the Royal Liverpool Hospital.

Riding was appointed a Commander of the Order of the British Empire (CBE) in the 1986 New Year Honours.
