= Piazza San Giovanni =

City square in Florence, Italy

Coordinates: 43°46′22.64″N 11°15′17.12″E

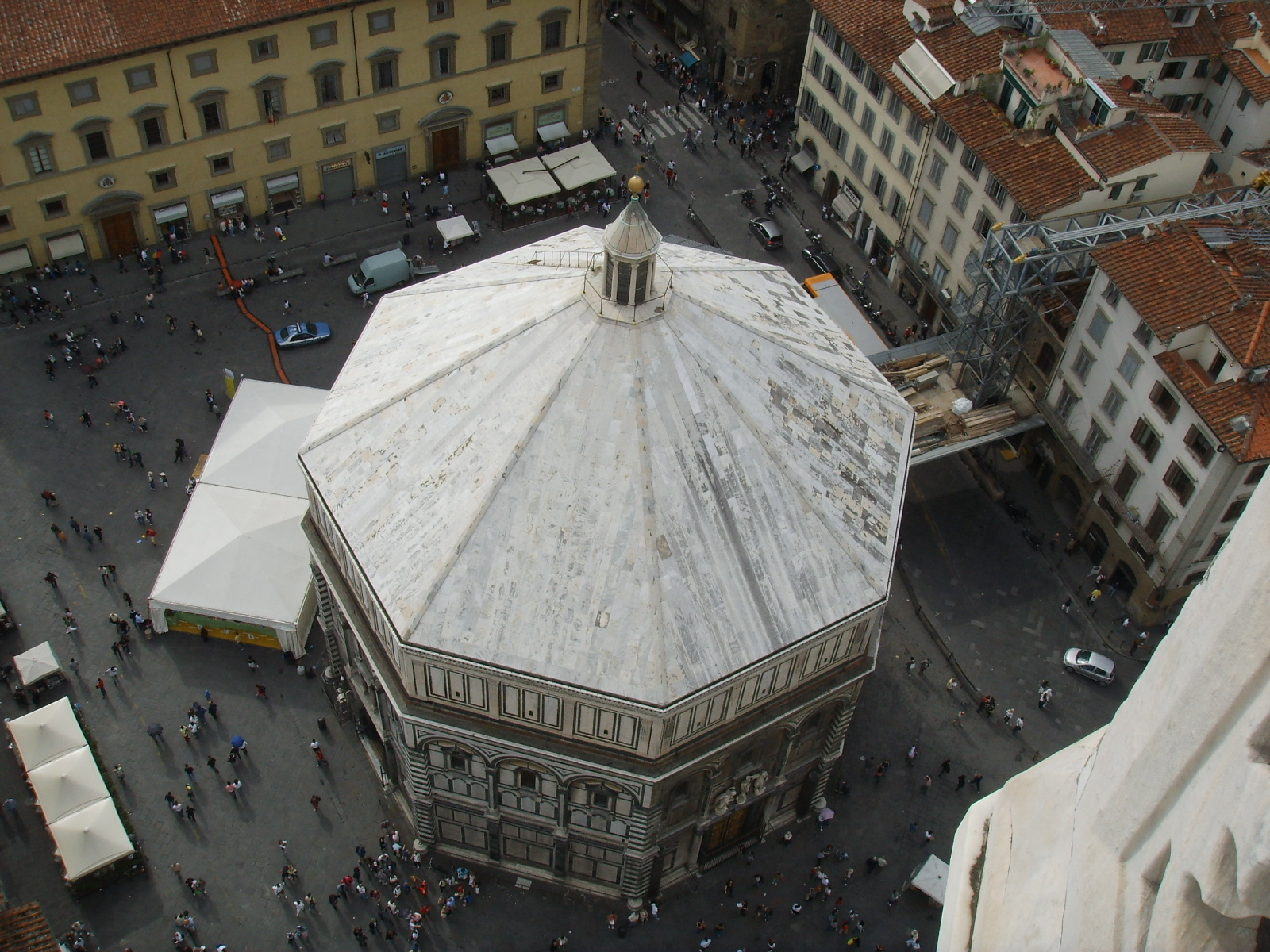
Piazza San Giovanni

Piazza San Giovanni is a city square in Florence, Italy.

== Buildings around the square ==
- Florence Baptistery
- Palazzo Arcivescovile, Florence
- Torre dei Lodi Focardi Marignolli
- Opera di San Giovanni
- Loggia del Bigallo

== Gallery ==
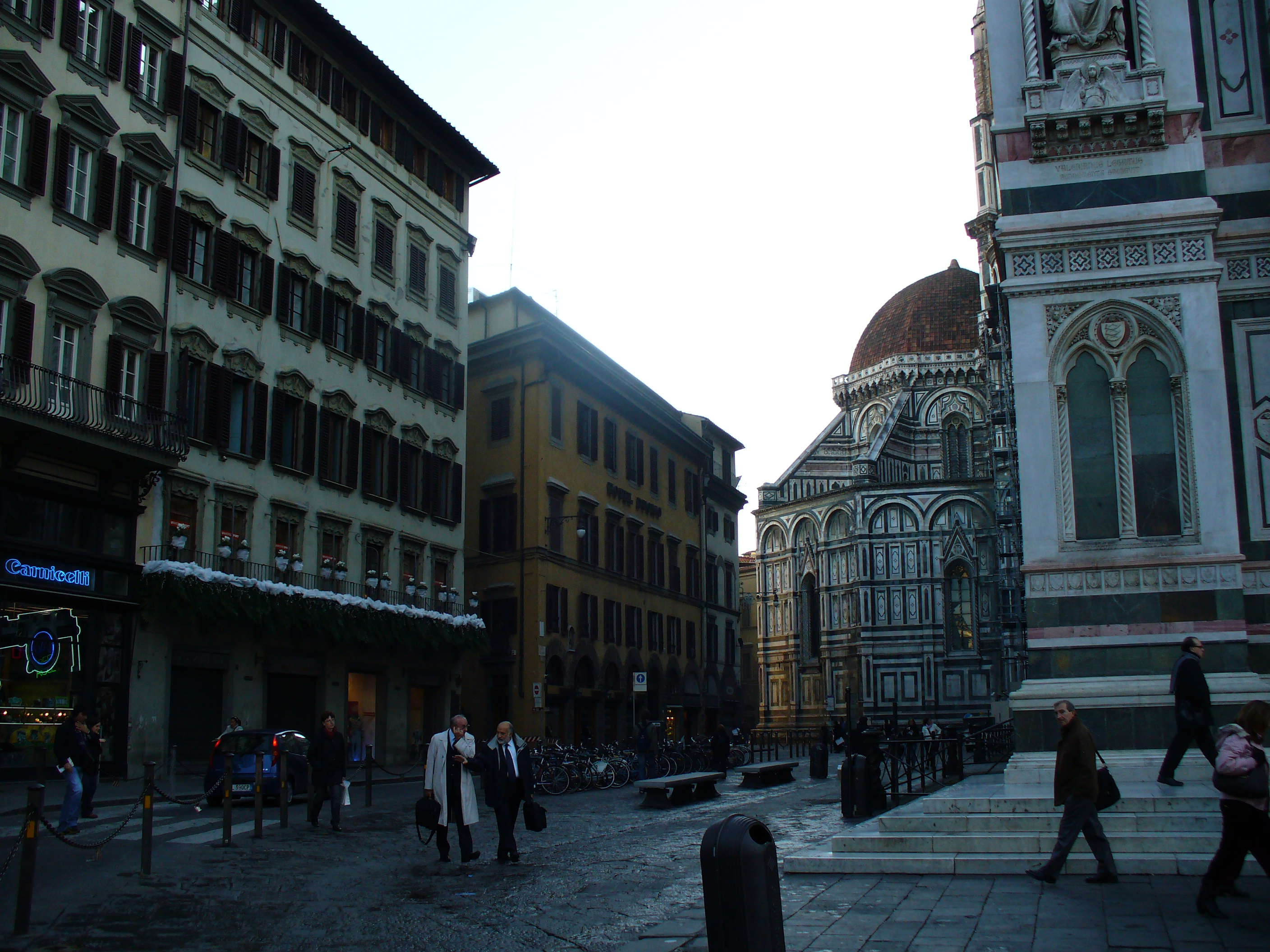
Piazza San Giovanni

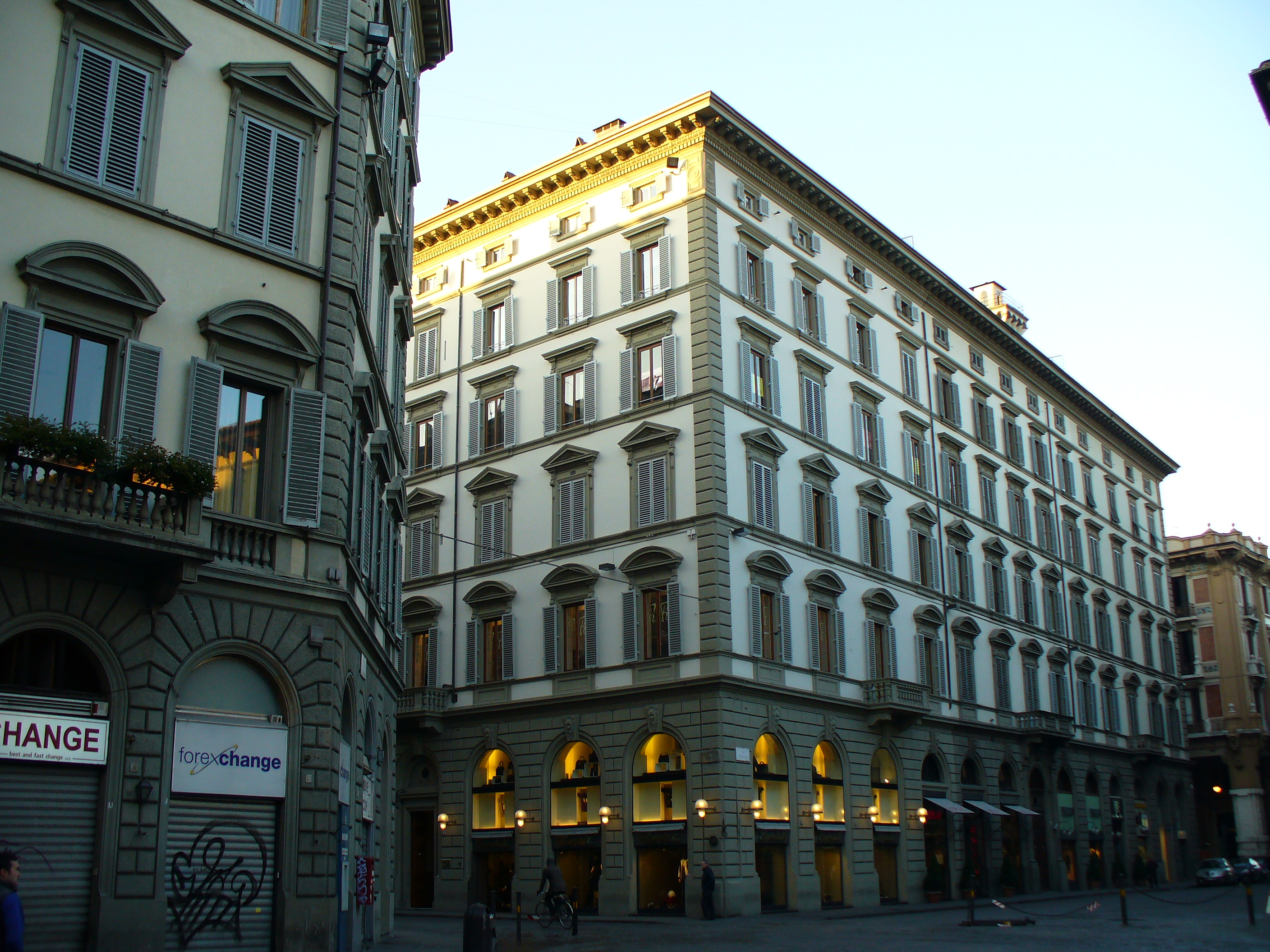
Piazza San Giovanni

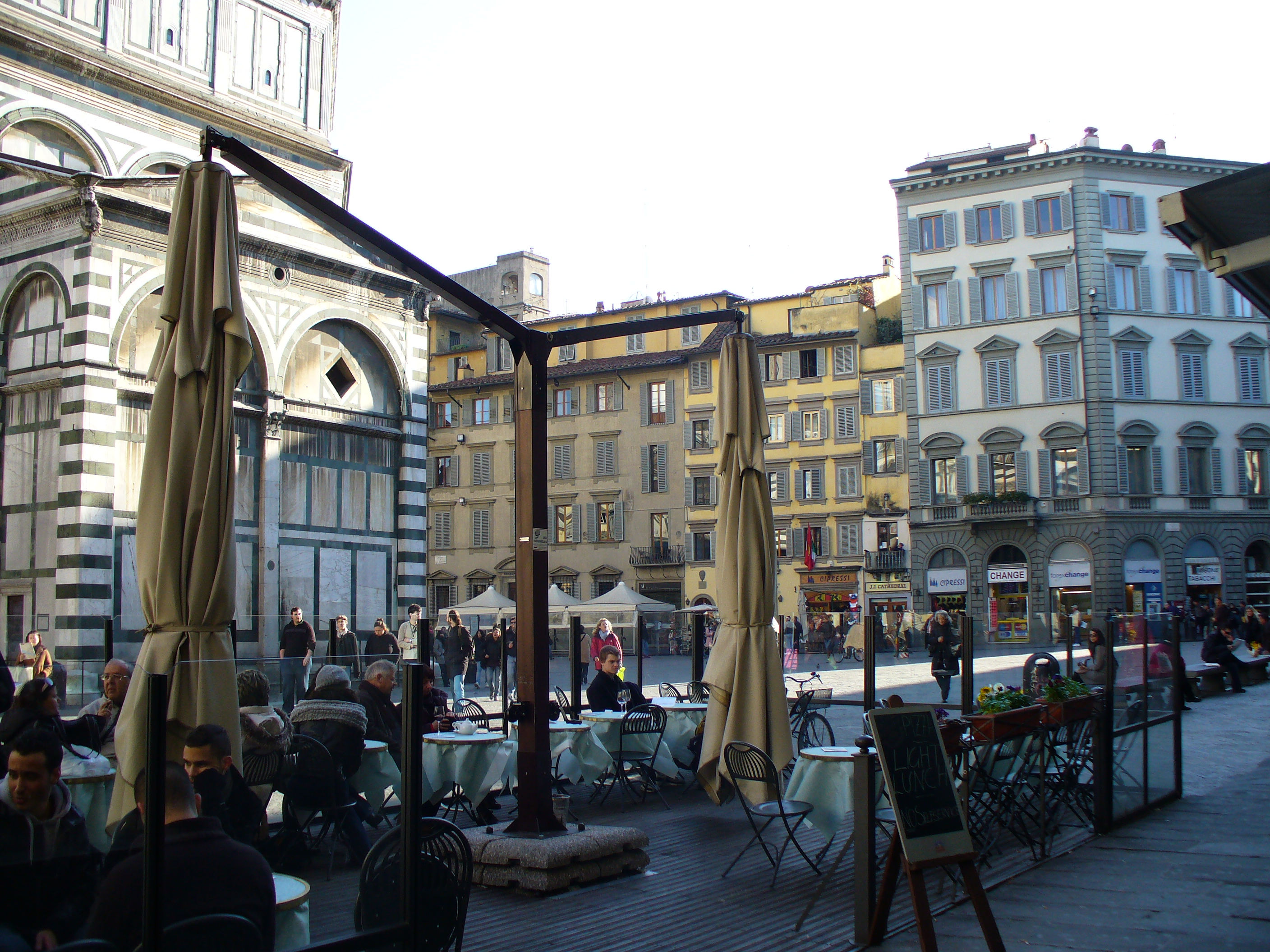
Piazza San Giovanni

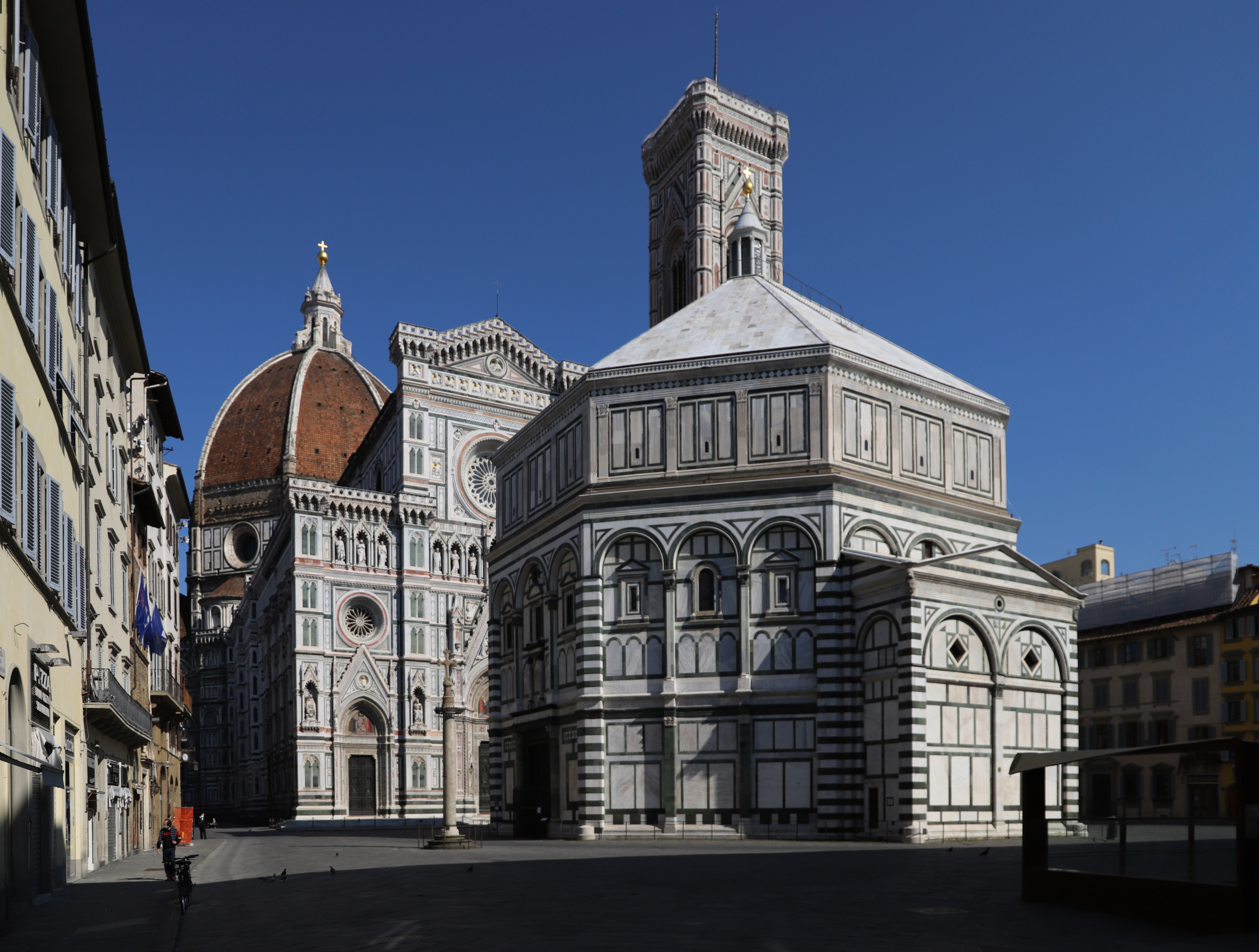
Piazza San Giovanni

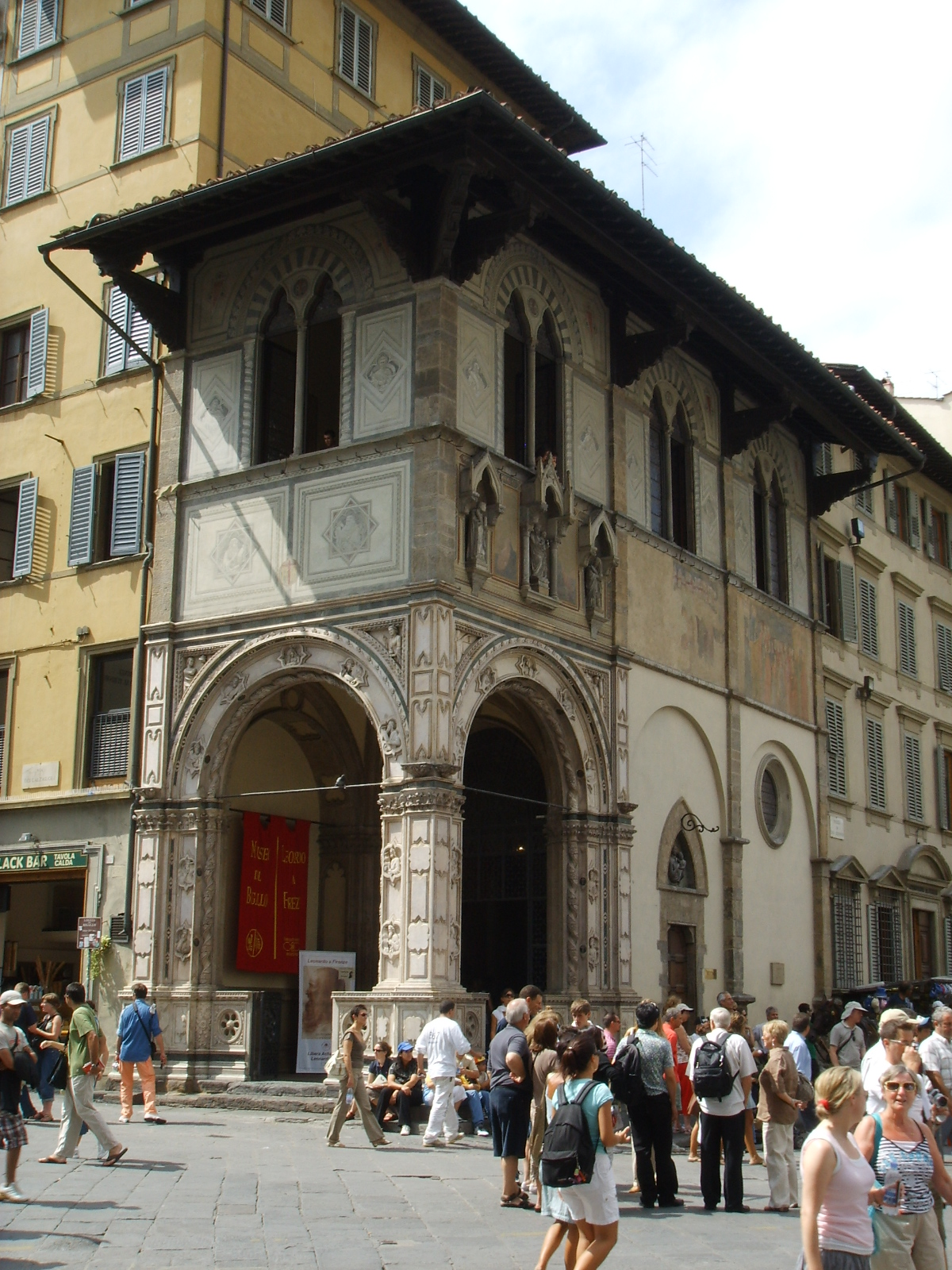
Loggia del Bigallo
