= Tom Boulton =

President of the Association of Anaesthetists of Great Britain and Ireland

Thomas Babington Boulton OBE (6 November 1925 – 1 July 2016) was president of the Association of Anaesthetists of Great Britain and Ireland. He was appointed OBE in the 1991 New Year Honours.
