= Archibald D. Marston =

British anaesthetist (1891–1962)

Archibald D. Marston CBE (1891–1962) was a British medical man. He was the first dean of the Royal College of Anaesthetists, serving from 1948 to 1952.

Marston's medical career began in 1909, as a dental student at Guy's Hospital. He became a consultant anaesthetist at Guy's in 1919.
