= Alastair Spence =

Alastair Andrew Spence CBE (1936 – 2015) was president of the Royal College of Anaesthetists for 1991 to 1994.
