= Franchi =

Franchi is a historic surname that can be traced to the Republic of Genoa, where it was a name of nobility. Due to its preeminence, it spread to surrounding nations and, due to its pronunciation, has thus been rendered as Franquis and Franquiz in parts of Spain. People with the name, and things named after them, include:

== People ==
- Alberto Herrera Franchi (1874–1954), Cuban general and provisional President of Cuba
- Aldo Franchi (1882–1958), American auto racer
- Alessandro Franchi (cardinal) (1819–1878), Italian cardinal and archbishop
- Alessandro Franchi (painter) (1838–1914), Italian painter
- Andrea Franchi (1335-1401), Italian Roman Catholic member of the Order of Preachers and Bishop of Pistoia
- Anna Franchi (1867-1954), Italian novelist, translator, playwright and journalist
- Antonio Franchi (1638–1709), Italian painter of the 17th Century
- Antonio Franchi (cyclist) (1936–2019), Italian racing cyclist
- Artemio Franchi (1922–1983), President of the Italian Football Federation
- Ausonio Franchi (1821–1895), Italian philosopher
- Carlo Franchi (composer) (1743–1779), Italian composer
- Carlo Franchi (1938–2021), Italian racing driver, known as Gimax
- Dany Franchi (born 1990), Italian blues guitarist, singer and songwriter
- Denis Franchi (born 2002), Italian footballer
- Dorothea Anne Franchi (1920–2003), New Zealand pianist, harpist, music educator and composer
- Elena Franchi (born 1996), Italian professional racing cyclist
- Franco Franchi (cyclist) (1923–2018), Italian racing cyclist
- Franco Franchi (1928–1992), Italian comedian
- Garry Franchi (born 1983), French professional football player
- Giovannina Franchi (1807–1872), Italian Roman Catholic professed religious
- Giuseppe Franchi (1731–1806), Italian Neoclassical sculptor
- Gregory "Greg" Franchi (born 1982), Belgian racing driver
- Jan Martínez Franchi (born 1998), Argentine volleyball player
- John Franchi (born 1982), retired American mixed martial artist
- Lorenzo Franchi (c. 1563-c. 1630), Italian painter
- Morena Franchi (born 1993), Argentine female volleyball player
- Paola Franchi (born 1953), Italian interior designer, artist, author and former model
- Rossello di Jacopo Franchi (c. 1377–c. 1456), Italian painter
- Rudy Franchi (1939–2024), American writer and editor
- Sergio Franchi (1926–1990), Italian-American tenor and actor

== Buildings ==
- Stadio Artemio Franchi, a football stadium in Florence, Italy
- Stadio Artemio Franchi – Montepaschi Arena, a football stadium in Siena, Italy

== Firearms ==
- Franchi SPAS-12, a combat shotgun
- Franchi SPAS-15, a dual-mode 12-gauge combat shotgun
- Franchi AL-48, a semi-automatic shotgun
- Franchi LF-57, a pressed-metal submachine gun

== Other uses ==
- Artemio Franchi Trophy, an international football competition
- Franchi (firearms), an Italian firearms company

== See also ==
- Saint-Franchy, Nièvre department, France
