= Ivan Magill =

Irish anaesthesiologist (1888–1986)

- Born: 23 July 1888; Larne, Ireland
- Died: 25 November 1986 (aged 98)
- Education: Queen's University Belfast
- Known for: Anaesthesia
- Scientific career
- Fields: Anaesthesiology

Sir Ivan Whiteside Magill KCVO (23 July 1888 – 25 November 1986) was an Irish-born anaesthetist who was responsible for much of the innovation and development in modern anaesthesia. He helped to establish the Association of Anaesthetists of Great Britain and Ireland. Several medical devices are named after him.

== Biography ==
Originally a general practitioner, he accepted a post at the Queen's Hospital, Sidcup, in 1919 as an anaesthetist. The hospital had been established for the treatment of facial injuries sustained in World War I. Working with plastic surgeon Harold Gillies, he was responsible for the development of numerous items of anaesthetic equipment but most particularly the single-tube technique of endotracheal anaesthesia. This was driven by the immense difficulties of administering "standard" anaesthetics such as chloroform and ether to men with severe facial injury using masks; they would cover the operative field.

Following the closure of the hospital, and the diminishing numbers of patients seen from the war era, he continued to work with Gillies in private practice but was also appointed to the Westminster and Brompton Hospitals, London. He was Knighted by Elizabeth II in 1960. He was closely involved in the establishment of the Association of Anaesthetists of Great Britain and Ireland as well as the Faculty of Anaesthesia of the Royal College of Surgeons where he developed the Diploma in Anaesthesia, the first professional examination in the specialty. Doctors can still be awarded the Magill medal for outstanding performance in the December sitting of the Final Fellowship examination.

In 2010, a plaque marking his birthplace was unveiled in the town of Larne, Northern Ireland.

== History of the endotracheal tube ==
The original tubes were cut from a roll of rubber industrial tubing by his assistant, hence the natural curve of the tube. A curved metal adaptor was designed (Magill oral and nasal connectors) and a 4" black rubber connecting hose to fit to the anesthetic circuit was adapted from an MG car brake hose and named the 'catheter mount' by Magill's theatre technician at Westminster Hospital. Originally, there was no inflatable cuff. The tube was packed either side of the sub-glottis by two green anaesthetic swabs, with ribbon gauze sewn on by hand to aid extraction at extubation of the endotracheal tube. Anaesthetic gel or ointment was used to lubricate the tube and provide some relief for the patient's sore throat post-procedure.

== Magill's developments ==
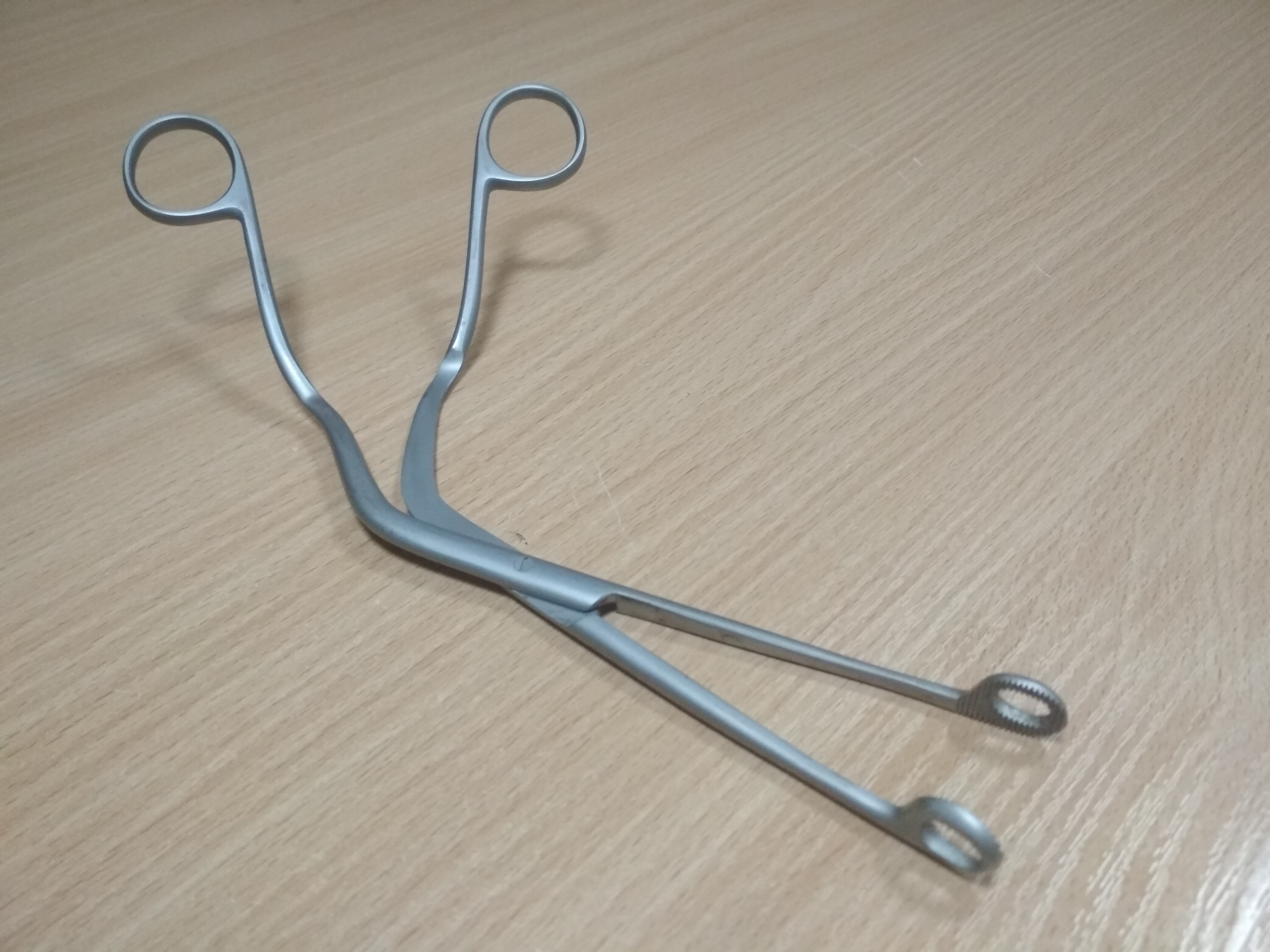
Magill forceps (right-handed)

- Endotracheal tube, anaesthesia (The Magill endotracheal tube, oral & nasal designs)
- An anaesthetic breathing system (Magill circuit and expiratory valve)
- Intubating forceps (Magill forceps)
- Laryngoscope (a straight bladed version)
- Catheter mount (endotracheal tube-to-circuit connector)
- Endotracheal tube connectors, oral & nasal versions
- Magill tracheal spray (glottic anaesthetic)
- Single-lung anaesthesia
- Endobronchial tubes and bronchial blockerss
- Bobbin flowmeters
- Helped establish the Diploma in Anaesthesia
- Helped found the Association of Anaesthetists in 1932
- Initiated the foundation of Association of Operating Theatre Technicians in 1945 (Now the College of Operating Department Practitioners)

== Papers ==
- Magill IW. "Endotracheal Anaesthesia" Proc RSM, 1928, 22(2):85-88
- Magill I. "Warming Ether Vapour for inhalation" Lancet 1921, i:1270 (letter)
- Magill I. "An apparatus for the Administration of Nitrous Oxide, Oxygen and Ether" Lancet 1923, ii: 228
- Magill I. "The Provision for Expiration in Endotracheal insufflation" Lancet 1923, ii: 68–9
- Magill I. "A Portable Apparatus for Tracheal Insufflation Anaesthesia" Lancet 1921, i: 918
- Rowbotham ES, Magill I. "Anaesthetics in the Plastic Surgery of the Face and Jaws" Proc RSM 1921, 14: 17–27
- Magill also contributed a chapter to Gillies HD, Millard R: Principles and Art of Plastic Surgery (Boston, Little Brown & Co, 1957)
