= Judith Hulf =

British anaesthetist

Judith Hulf CBE FRCA is a British anaesthetist. She was the president of the Royal College of Anaesthetists from 2006 to 2009.

== Career ==
Hulf qualified from the Royal Free Hospital School of Medicine, London. She is a Consultant in Anaesthesia at University College London Hospitals NHS Foundation Trust, and was on the faculty of Middlesex Hospital and University College Hospital, London. Hulf has practiced at The Heart Hospital, previously located at University College Hospital at Westmoreland Street, London.

Hulf has served as the Director of Education and Standards the General Medical Council. As one of the Senior Medical Advisor's, Hulf has chaired numerous working groups within the General Medical Council, including the development of a medical licensing assessment (MLA) with UK medical schools, and more recently the release of guidance for doctors carrying out cosmetic procedures. Hulf is a former director of the British Journal of Anaesthesia, and is presently a non-executive director of St George's University Hospitals NHS Foundation Trust.

Her interests include cardiothoracic anaesthesia, training and education.

A portrait of Hulf by Keith Breeden RP was commissioned during her term as president of the Royal College of Anaesthetists (2006-2009).

== Honours ==
Hulf was appointed Commander of the Order of the British Empire (CBE) in the 2009 Birthday Honours for services to anaesthesia.

== Memberships ==
Hulf is an honorary member of the Association of Anaesthetists. She is also a member of the Association for Cardiothoracic Anesthesia and Critical Care.

Hulf has been a member of the Review Group for Modernising Medical Careers (MMC) at the Department of Health and Social Care on behalf of the Academy of Medical Royal Colleges, the MMC Programme Board for England, and a member of the Joint Medical Consultative Council (formerly the Joint Consultants' Committee) of the British Medical Association. She is also a Co-opted member of Council of the Association of Anaesthetists of Great Britain and Ireland, and an active member of the Association of Cardiothoracic Anaesthetists.

== Personal ==
She was married to Michael Hulf and lives in London. They have two children.
