= Cedric Prys-Roberts =

British anesthesiologist

Cedric Prys-Roberts is emeritus professor of anaesthesia at the University of Bristol. He was president of the Royal College of Anaesthetists from 1994 to 1997.
