= Leo Strunin =

Leo Strunin was president of the Royal College of Anaesthetists from 1997 to 2000.

== See also ==
- History of anesthesiology
