= William W. Mushin =

William Woolf Mushin FRCS 1966, CBE 1971 (September 1910 – 22 January 1993) was Director and Professor of Anaesthetics Welsh National School of Medicine, University of Wales, 1947 to 1975. He was also the dean of the Royal College of Anaesthetists from 1961 to 1964.

He authored the books Physics for the Anaesthetist (1946), Anaesthesia for the Poor Risk (1948) and Automatic Ventilation of Lungs (1959)
