= Frankis T. Evans =

Dean of the Royal College of Anaesthetists from 1955 to 1958

Frankis Tilney Evans FRCS (9 March 1900 – 26 August 1974) was the dean of the Royal College of Anaesthetists from 1955 to 1958.
