= Loggia del Bigallo =

Building in Florence, Italy

Coordinates: 43°46′21.89″N 11°15′18.92″E

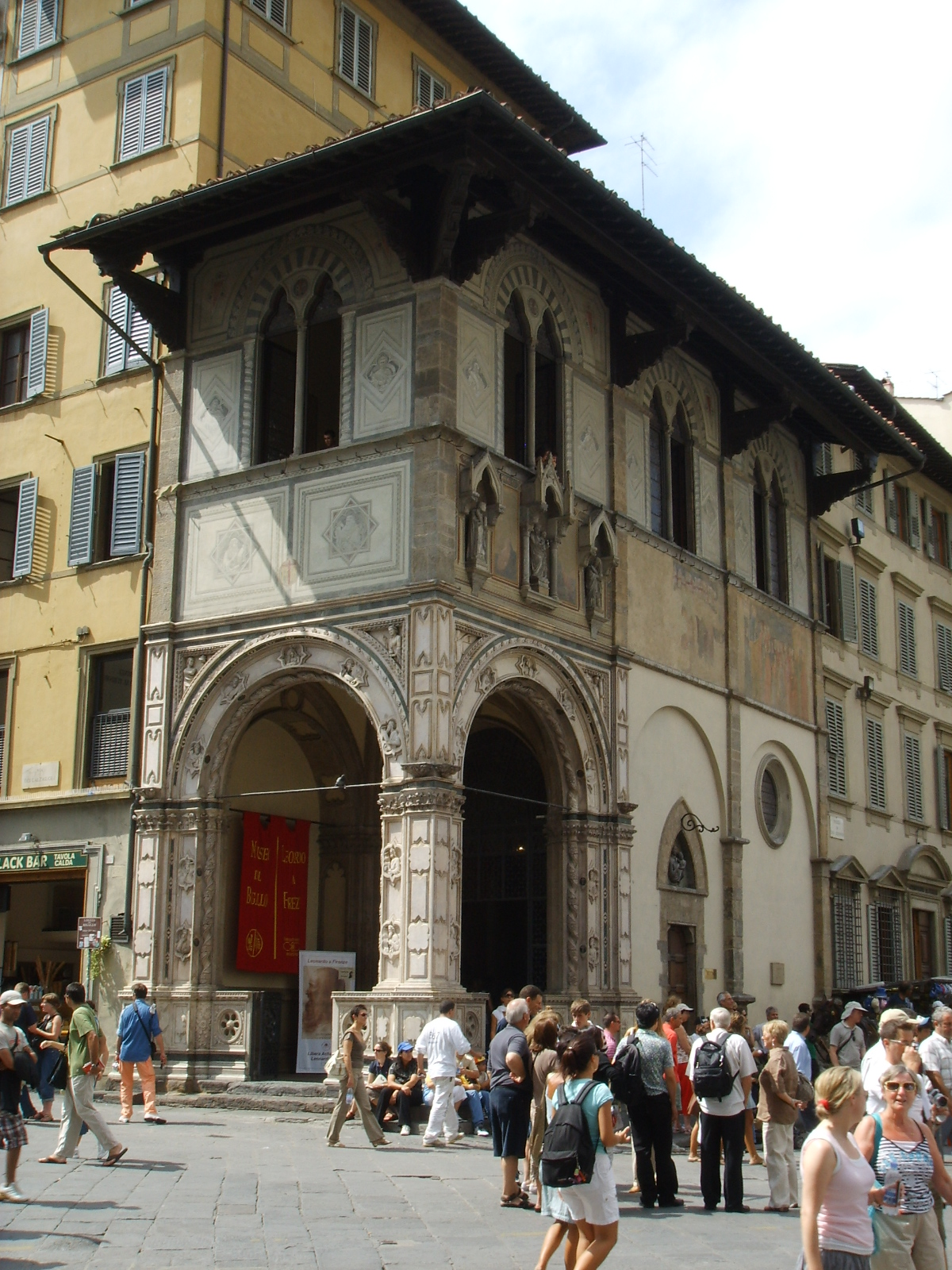
The Loggia del Bigallo-

The Loggia del Bigallo is a late Gothic building in Florence, region of Tuscany, Italy. It stands at the corner of Piazza San Giovanni and via Calzaioli; tradition holds the site near the Baptistry of Florence was donated by a benefactor.

== History ==
This building is one of a dozen public loggias in the city, and is linked with two fraternities or companies dealing with local charity.

The Compagnia della Misericordia, or "Company of Mercy", was concerned with the transport of the sick, burial of the indigent dead, as well as the care of orphans. The open loggia served to shelter lost children and unwanted infants who were abandoned to the care of the brotherhood,

The Compagnia di Santa Maria del Bigallo or simply del Bigallo, was founded in 1244 by Saint Peter of Verona, Saint Peter Martyr, and was formerly housed near Orsanmichele. This group focused on the housing of the indigent, and also cared for pilgrims and travellers at their Ospedale di Santa Maria alle Fonti, nicknamed "del Bigallo", at Fonteviva.

Financial irregularities forced the authorities in 1425, under Cosimo de'Medici, treasurer of the Bigallo, to merge the two groups, and reorganize the structure. As time passed, the function of the Bigallo began to dominate that of the Misericordia.

However, it was the Compagnia della Misericordia which had commissioned the structure we see, probably from the architect-sculptor Alberto Arnoldi; it was built in 1352–58. The second story was rebuilt after a fire in 1442. Its two arched bays are richly decorated with bas-reliefs of prophets, angels, the Virtues, a Christ giving the benediction and an Ecce Homo. In 1697, the arches were walled-up in order to provide more space for the oratory that is attached to the loggia; the masonry was removed in 1889, revealing the long-hidden decoration. Mullioned windows pierce the walls of the floor above, which was originally richly frescoed. and three tabernacles, the work of Filippo di Cristofano, 1412, frame the Madonna and Child, Saint Lucy and Saint Peter Martyr, patron of the brotherhood. The mid-14th century statues were installed here when the two confraternities joined in 1425.

The interior contains a museum of objects related to the Confraternita della Misericordia and the Compagnia del Bigallo.

== Sources ==
- Touring Club Italiano, (1964) Firenze e dintorni, 109f.
