= Peter Nightingale (physician) =

Former president of the Royal College of Anaesthetists

Peter Nightingale was president of the Royal College of Anaesthetists from 2009 to 2012.
