= Michael Rosen (anaesthetist) =

Michael Rosen CBE (17 October 1927 – 2 May 2018) was the president of the Royal College of Anaesthetists from 1988 to 1991.
