= Joint Faculty of Intensive Care Medicine of Ireland =

- Comhdhámh na hÉireann um Míochaine Dhianchúraim
- Abbreviation: JFICMI
- Predecessor: Irish Board of Intensive Care Medicine
- Formation: 16 December 2008; 17 years ago
- Location: 22 Merrion Square, Dublin, Ireland
- Region served: Ireland
- Dean: Dr Enda O’Connor
- Parent organisation: College of Anaesthesiologists of Ireland; Royal College of Physicians of Ireland; Royal College of Surgeons in Ireland; Intensive Care Society of Ireland
- Website: www.jficmi.ie

The Joint Faculty of Intensive Care Medicine of Ireland (JFICMI; Irish: Comhdhámh na hÉireann um Míochaine Dhianchúraim) is the organisation involved with the training, assessment, practice and continuing professional development of intensive care physicians in Ireland.

It was launched on 16 December 2008 by agreement between four parent organisations: the College of Anaesthetists of Ireland (CAI; now the College of Anaesthesiologists of Ireland), the Royal College of Surgeons in Ireland (RCSI), the Royal College of Physicians of Ireland (RCPI), and the Intensive Care Society of Ireland. It took over the roles of the Irish Board of Intensive Care Medicine which had previously been formed in 1994. In 2017 the faculty's governance structures were revised, meaning that it became a faculty of the CAI reporting to that body's council, but that it would remain a "joint faculty" in that it would continue to have representation at board level from the RCSI and RCPI.
