= Anaesthesia (journal) =

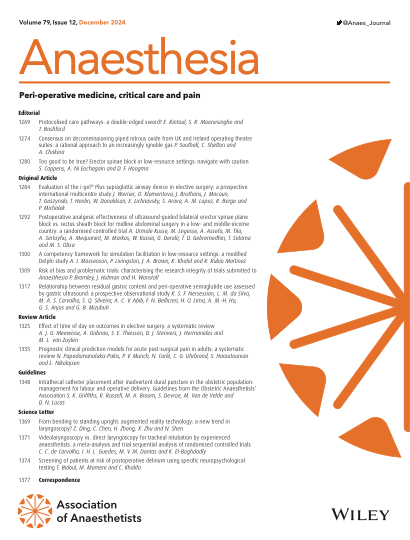
- Discipline: Anaesthesia
- Language: English
- Edited by: Matthew D. Wiles

Publication details
- History: 1946–present
- Publisher: Wiley-Blackwell
- Frequency: Monthly
- Impact factor: 9.8 (2025)

Standard abbreviations
- ISO 4: Anaesthesia

Indexing
- ISSN: 0003-2409 (print); 1365-2044 (web)
- OCLC no.: 715443203

Links
- Journal homepage; Online access; Online archive

Anaesthesia is a monthly peer-reviewed medical journal covering research in anaesthesia, including intensive care, peri-operative medicine, critical care medicine, and pain therapy. It is the official journal of the Association of Anaesthetists.

It is the partner journal to Anaesthesia Reports, which is an open-access journal publishing original, peer-reviewed articles, reviews, case reports, media content, and associated papers on all aspects of anaesthesia, peri-operative medicine, intensive care and pain therapy.

== Abstracting and indexing ==
The journal is abstracted and indexed in:

- Science Citation Index Expanded
- Current Contents Clinical Medicine
- Current Contents Life Sciences
- Essential Science Indicators
- Scopus
- Index Medicus/MEDLINE/PubMed

According to the Journal Citation Reports, the journal's 2025 impact factor is 9.8. According to Scopus, the journal's 2025 CiteScore is 14.7.
