= Jean-Pierre van Besouw =

British anesthesiologist (1957–2017)

Jean-Pierre van Besouw (died 2017) was president of the Royal College of Anaesthetists from 2012 to 2015.

He was an anesthetist at St George's University Hospitals NHS Foundation Trust.
