= Cyril F. Scurr =

British academic (1920–2012)

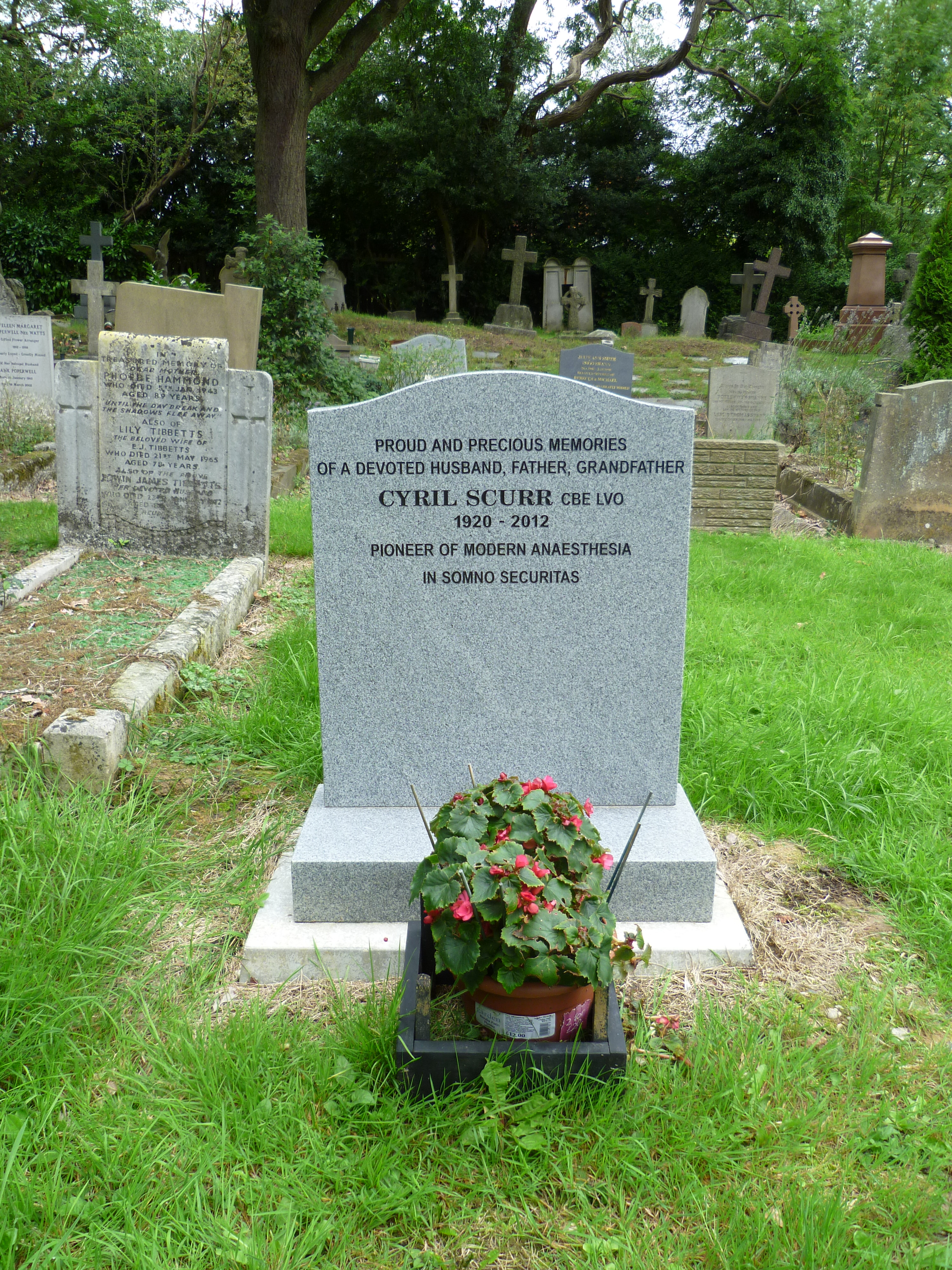
Cyril Scurr's grave at St Andrew's church, Totteridge

Cyril Frederick Scurr CBE LVO (1920–2012) was dean of the Royal College of Anaesthetists.

He is buried at St Andrew's church, Totteridge, London.
