= Giovannina Franchi =

Italian Roman Catholic nun

Blessed Giovannina Franchi

Virgin
- Born: 24 June 1807; Como, Lombardy, Napoleonic Italian Kingdom
- Died: 23 February 1872 (aged 64); Como, Lombardy, Kingdom of Italy
- Venerated in: Roman Catholic Church
- Beatified: 20 September 2014, Como Cathedral, Italy by Cardinal Angelo Amato
- Feast: 23 February

Giovannina Franchi (24 June 1807 – 23 February 1872) was an Italian Roman Catholic professed religious and the founder of the Suore Infermiere dell'Addolorata. Franchi was engaged for a brief period of time and the death of her fiancé prompted her to review her life and what her religious convictions were telling her to do; she had been involved in countless charitable works in the past and so dedicated herself to the care of the ill. Her order became tasked with aiding the ill across Como, and the smallpox epidemic in 1871 thrust them into action, later claiming Franchi's life.

Franchi's beatification was celebrated on 20 September 2014.

== Life ==
Giovannina Franchi was born on 24 June 1807 in Como as the second of seven children to the magistrate Giovanni Franchi and Giuseppina Maza; she was born into one of Como's wealthiest families. Her brothers were Antonio, Pietro and Luigi, while her sisters were Carolina, Angela and Giuseppa. Her baptism was celebrated on 25 June 1807. Franchi commenced her education in 1814 at the San Carlo boarding school that the Visitation Sisters ran, and she was there until 1824. Franchi received her Confirmation on 11 May 1818 and later completed her studies in 1824. At the age of 18, she devoted herself to teaching catechism and to charitable works.

In 1840, she became betrothed, but her fiancé (who was an older man) died due to a disease not long after the engagement. In 1842, her childless uncle Carlo Andrea Franchi divided his estate among his nieces and nephews, and she received 3000 liras. It was around 1846 that she met for the first time Gian Abbondio Crotti (the Como Cathedral canon), who became her spiritual director and close collaborator. Her mother died in 1849 and her father soon followed in 1852 which came all of a sudden with little warning; her father had bequeathed 32 000 lires to her but was concerned about her unmarried status so had his two sons Antonio and Pietro take care of her. She put her fortune at the service of the needy, providing home care to those who would not be accepted in hospital.

On 27 September 1853 – alongside Nina Luigia Allegri and other companions, Lucrezia Schiavetti and Anna Maria Poletti – she established the Suore Infermiere dell'Addolorata; diocesan approval for the order came later on 25 December 1862 from the Bishop of Como Carlo Marzorati. Her order's mission suffered a slight setback in late 1856 with Crotti's death, which forced Franchi to assume greater control and direction of her order. Franchi assumed the religious habit for the first time on 21 November 1858.

In 1866, her health began to decline, and it was at this time that she drew up her last will in anticipation of her death. Franchi died of smallpox on 23 February 1872 at 5:30 am after contracting the disease in the summer of 1871 while tending to victims of the disease. Her funeral was celebrated the next morning. In 2008, her order had 81 religious in nine houses and it had expanded to both Switzerland and Argentina. The order later received the papal decree of praise from Pope Pius XI on 25 January 1935 and official papal approval on 8 June 1942 from Pope Pius XII; the order was aggregated to the Order of Friars Minor Capuchin on 16 July 1942.

== Beatification ==
The "nihil obstat" (nothing against the cause) was introduced under Pope John Paul II on 18 June 1994; it allowed for the beatification process to commence in Como and titled her as a Servant of God. The diocesan process in Como commenced on 27 September 1994 and closed later on 27 September 1995 before it received the validation needed in Rome from the Congregation for the Causes of Saints on 18 October 1996. The Positio dossier was compiled and sent to the C.C.S. in 1998 before historians reviewed and approved it on 3 April 2001. Theologians later approved the dossier's contents on 17 June 2011, as did the C.C.S. members on 6 November 2012. Pope Benedict XVI recognized that Franchi had lived a life of heroic virtue and named her to be Venerable on 20 December 2012.

The miracle for beatification was investigated in the diocese of its origin from 27 September 1996 until 23 February 1997, at which stage all documentation from those inquiries was sent to the C.C.S., which validated the process on 7 November 1997. The panel of medical experts approved this healing to be a genuine miracle that science could not explain on 14 February 2013; theologians also approved it on 11 June 2013, as did the cardinal and bishop members of the C.C.S. on 3 December 2013. Pope Francis approved this miracle attributed to her intercession on 9 December 2013 and announced her beatification to be held on 20 September 2014 in her native Como. Cardinal Angelo Amato presided over the beatification on the pope's behalf.

The current postulator for this cause is the Franciscan Giovangiuseppe Califano. The original postulator at the time the cause opened was the Franciscan priest Juan Folguera Trepat.
