= W. Derek Wylie =

British academic (1918–1998)

William Derek Wylie (24 October 1918 – 29 September 1998) was a British academic who was the dean of the Royal College of Anaesthetists from 1967 to 1970.
