= Bernard Johnson (anaesthetist) =

Bernard Richard Millar Johnson FRCS (25 April 1905 – 18 May 1959). Among other distinctions, Mr Johnson held the position of senior consultant anaesthestist at the Middlesex Hospital, he was adviser to the War Office in the area of anaesthesia, dean of the Royal College of Anaesthetists from 1952 to 1955, with whom he also had a Fellowship.

He was educated at both Brighton College and Middlesex Hospital Medical School.

He died suddenly at his Sussex home on 18 May 1959.
