= Magill forceps =

Surgical instrument

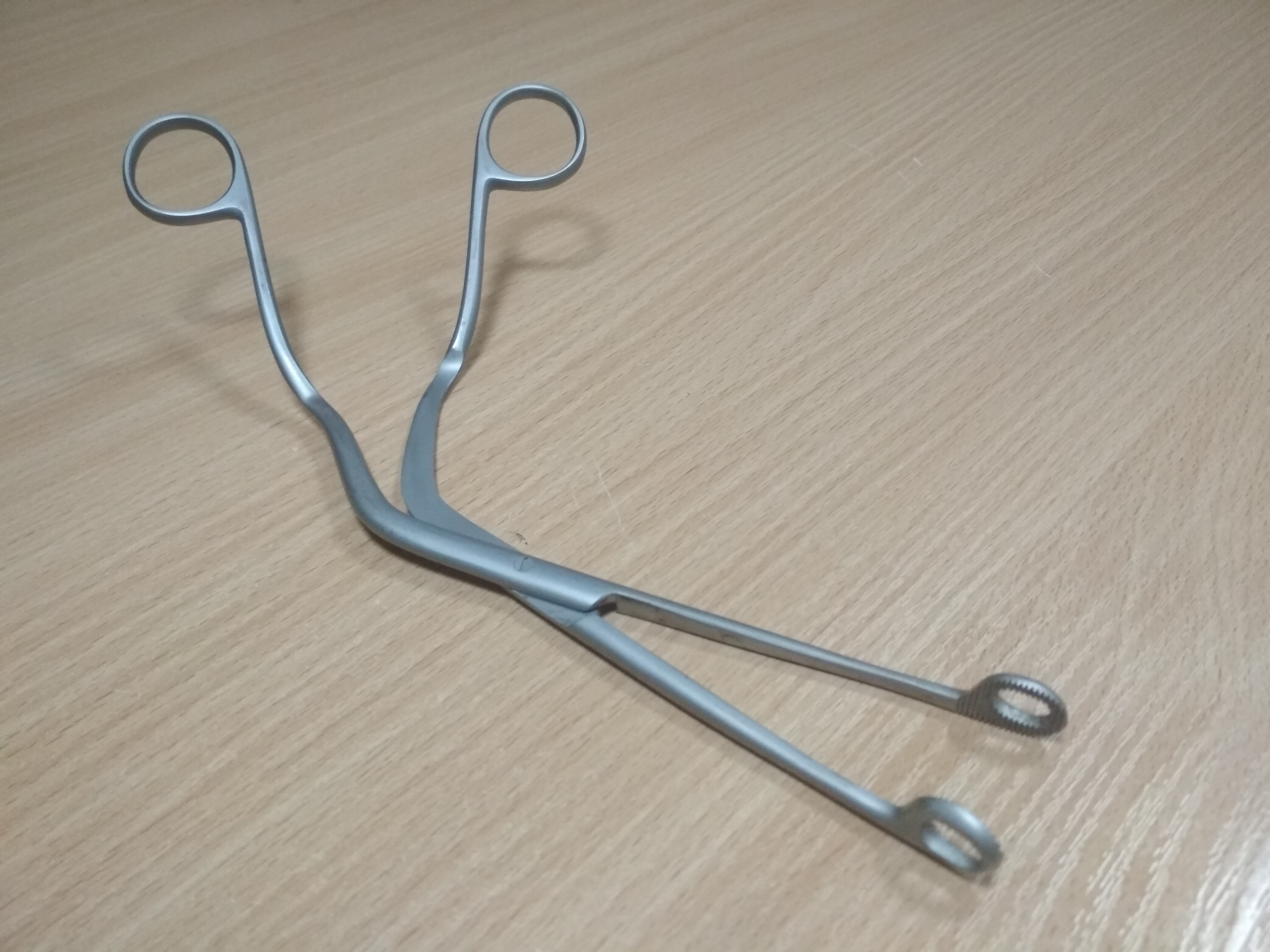
- Magill forceps showing the characteristic angled design
- Synonyms: Intubation forceps
- Specialty: Anaesthesiology
- Intervention: Intubation
- Inventor(s): Ivan Magill
- Related items: Laryngoscope
- [edit on Wikidata]

Magill forceps are angled surgical tongs used to guide breathing tubes into the windpipe or retrieve obstructions from the throat without blocking the view of the larynx. Their right-angle bend keeps the handles outside the mouth while serrated openings at the tips grip tubes or debris securely. The stainless-steel instrument comes in infant, child and adult lengths and has altered little since Sir Ivan Magill introduced it in the early 1920s. It remains standard equipment in operating theatres, emergency departments and ambulance airway kits around the world. While highly effective, the instrument requires careful technique to avoid complications such as dental trauma or soft tissue injury during use.

== History and design ==
The Magill forceps are angled ring-handled forceps devised in the early 1920s by the Irish anaesthetist Sir Ivan W. Magill to permit manipulation of airway devices without obstructing the laryngoscopist's line of sight. The instrument's 90-degree mid-shaft bend and serrated, fenestrated tips enable the operator to grasp objects deep in the oropharynx while the handles remain outside the mouth, reducing the risk of dental trauma and preserving vision of the glottis. Standard patterns are manufactured in stainless steel and supplied in lengths of roughly 16 cm for neonates, 20 cm for paediatric use and 24 cm for adults, allowing a size to be matched to the patient's anatomical dimensions.

== Clinical applications ==
Contemporary airway textbooks describe three principal clinical applications: (i) advancing a nasotracheal tube from the oropharynx through the vocal cords under direct laryngoscopy, (ii) retrieving foreign material that is causing or threatens to cause upper airway obstruction, and (iii) directing nasogastric or oropharyngeal packing into the oesophagus during head and neck surgery. During nasotracheal intubation the forceps are held in the right hand so that the curve follows the path of the tube; careless clamping may tear the cuff or lacerate mucous membranes, prompting some authors to recommend grasping the tube above the cuff or partially inflating the cuff before engagement. When foreign-body airway obstruction is encountered in pre-hospital or in-hospital settings, international resuscitation guidelines advise that "appropriately skilled healthcare providers use Magill forceps" once laryngoscopy has visualised the object, a recommendation supported by clinical evidence of high removal success and improved neurological outcome in out-of-hospital cardiac arrest patients.

== Complications and cautions ==
The instrument's efficacy is balanced by recognised hazards: poor visualisation can lead to blind clamping of soft tissue, over-zealous force may fracture teeth, and repeated attempts prolong apnoea time; therefore current training manuals emphasise limiting grasping attempts to those necessary and abandoning the technique if the object cannot be clearly seen. Alternative or adjunct manoeuvres include cuff inflation or video-laryngoscopic guidance, yet Magill forceps remain the standard tool because they require no complex setup, fit existing laryngoscope workflows and can also be sterilised rapidly between cases by autoclaving. Although several modified designs—such as extra-curved or insulated tips for laser surgery—have been marketed, the basic configuration introduced by Magill more than a century ago remains largely unchanged in operating theatres, emergency departments and ambulance services worldwide.
