= Peter Hutton (anaesthetist) =

Former academic in the United Kingdom

Peter Hutton was president of the Royal College of Anaesthetists from 2000 to 2003. He was elected a Fellow of the Academy of Medical Sciences (FMedSci) in 1998.
