= Association of Anaesthetists of Great Britain and Ireland =

Professional association for anaesthetists in the United Kingdom and Ireland

Coordinates: 51.5194°N 0.1451°W

Association of Anaesthetists
- Founded: 1932
- Founder: Dr Henry W. Featherstone, Sir Ivan Magill
- Purpose: Anaesthesia
- President: Dr Tim Meek
- Website: http://www.anaesthetists.org

The Association of Anaesthetists, in full the Association of Anaesthetists of Great Britain and Ireland (AAGBI), is a professional association for anaesthetists in the United Kingdom and Ireland.

It was founded by Dr Henry Featherstone in 1932, when GPs gave most anaesthetics in the UK and Ireland as a sideline. Anaesthetists were not respected by other specialists and were poorly paid. Surgeons provided referrals and collected and paid their fees. The AAGBI's negotiations before the NHS was established in 1948 ensured anaesthetists received consultant status. It instigated the founding of the Faculty of Anaesthetists of the Royal College of Surgeons of England (now the Royal College of Anaesthetists) in 1947 and supported the foundation of the equivalent Faculty of the Royal College of Surgeons in Ireland (now the College of Anaesthesiologists of Ireland in 1959.

The AAGBI adopted the motto "in somno securitas" (safe in sleep) when it was granted the right to bear arms by King George VI in 1945. The AAGBI office is located in the centre of London.

== Past presidents ==
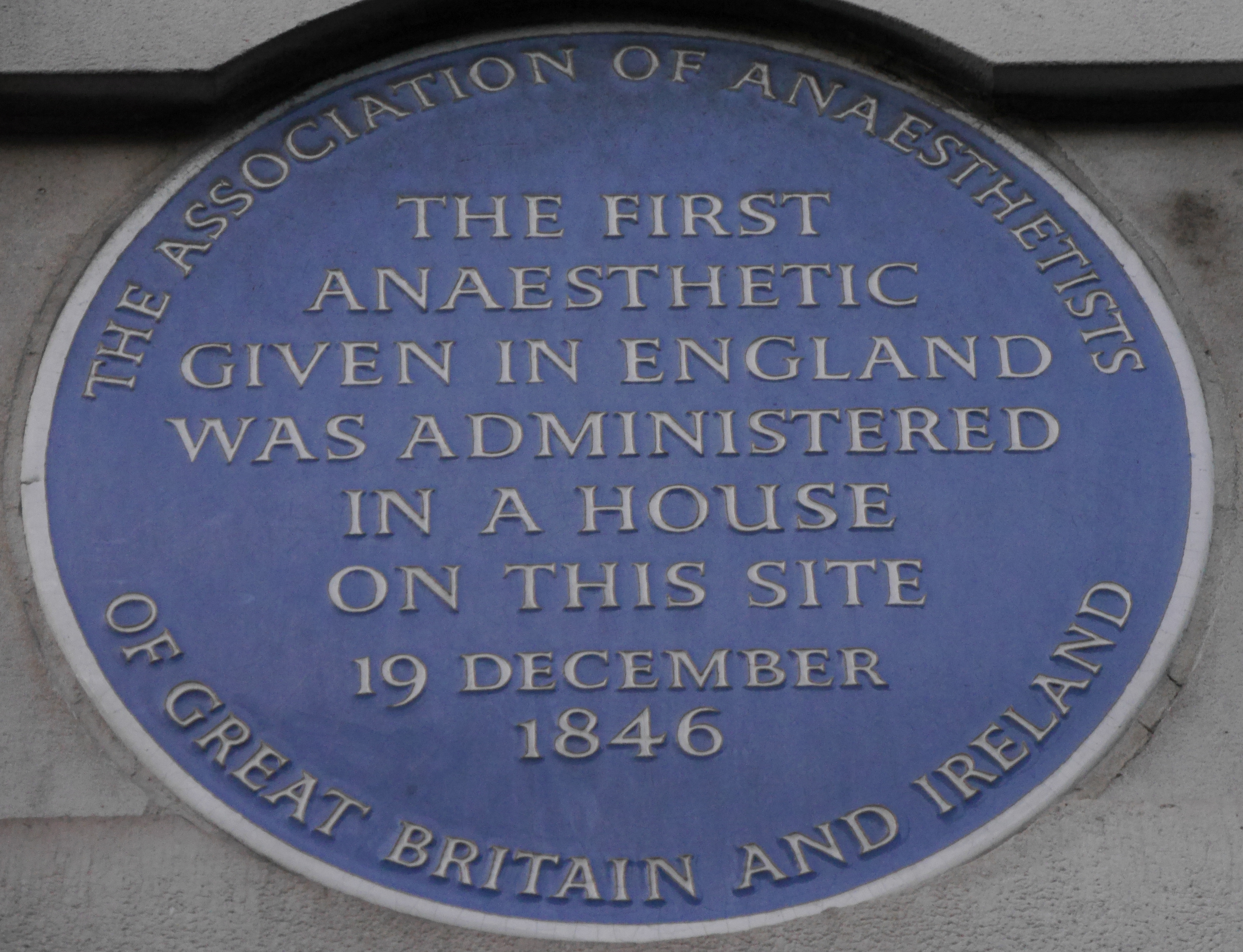
Blue plaque, London

- 1932-35 - Henry W Featherstone OBE MD LLDHon FFARCS
- 1935-38 - Joseph Blomfield OBE MD FRCS FFARCS
- 1938-41 - Zebulon Mennell FFARCS
- 1941-44 - Ashley Daly FRCS FFARCS
- 1944-47 - Archibald D Marston CBE MD FRCS FFARCS
- 1947-50 - John Gillies CVO MC FRCSEd FFARCS
- 1950-53 - W Alexander Low MC FFARCS
- 1953-56 - Sir Geoffrey Organe MD FRCS FFARCS FFARACSHon FFARCSIHon
- 1956-59 - T Cecil Gray CBE KCSG OStJ MD FRCP FRCS FFARCSHon
- 1959-62 - Ronald Jarman DSC FRCS FFARCS
- 1962-65 - Vernon F Hall CVO FRCA FFARCSHon
- 1965-67 - Herbert H Pinkerton FRCP (Glasg) FFARCS
- 1967-69 - R Patrick W Shackleton CBE DM FFARCS
- 1969-71 - A John W Beard MD FRCA
- 1971-73 - J Alfred Lee FFARCS FFARCSIHon MMSA
- 1973-76 - Philip J Helliwell FRCA
- 1976-78 - Cyril F Scurr CBE LVO FRCS FRCA FFARCSIHon
- 1978-80 - Stanley A Mason FRCA AKC
- 1980-82 - W Derek Wylie FRCP FRCS FRCA FANZCAHon
- 1982-84 - Michael D Vickers FRCA FANZCAHon
- 1984-86 - Thomas B. Boulton OBE TD FRCA FDSRCS
- 1986-88 - Michael Rosen CBE FRCS FRCOG FRCA FFARCSIHon
- 1988-90 - Maurice M Burrows FRCA
- 1990-92 - Peter J F Baskett FRCA MRCP
- 1992-94 - William R MacRae FRCSEd, FRCA, FFARCSI
- 1994-96 - S Morrell Lyons OBE MD FRCA FFARCSI
- 1996-98 - W Leslie M Baird FRCA FRCP (Glasg)
- 1998-00 - Maldwyn Morgan MB BS DA FRCA
- 2000-02 - Professor Leo Strunin FRCA FRCPC
- 2002-04 - Dr Peter G M Wallace FRCA FRCP (Glasg)
- 2004-06 - Professor Mike Harmer MD FRCA FCARCSI (Hon)
- 2006-08 - Dr David K Whitaker FRCA FFPMRCA FFICM Hon FCARCSI
- 2008-10 - Dr Richard J S Birks MB CHB FRCA Hon FCARCSI
- 2010-12 - Dr Iain H Wilson MB CHB FFARCS
- 2012-14 - Dr William Harrop-Griffiths MA MB BS FRCA
- 2014-16 - Dr Andrew Hartle MB ChB FRCA FFICM
- 2016-18 - Dr Paul Clyburn MB MRCP FRCA
- 2018-20 - Dr Kathleen Ferguson MB ChB DA FRCA
- 2020-22 - Dr Mike Nathanson MBBS MRCP FRCA
- 2022-24 - Dr Matthew Davies BSc MBChB MRCGP
- 2024-present Dr Tim Meek

== Education and meetings ==
=== Events ===
The society holds two main annual meetings. Winter Scientific Meeting (WSM) is the Association's largest annual event. Held in London each year, WSM is the leading anaesthetic meeting in the UK with an attendance of around 800 national and international delegates. The scientific programme focuses on current issues in anaesthesia. There is a trade exhibition with around 40 companies in anaesthetics attending. WSM is aimed at all levels of anaesthetists from trainees to consultants and is a European CPD accredited meeting.

The Annual Congress is the flagship event of the Association and is held in various locations around the UK and Ireland. Annual Congress is one of the leading anaesthetic meetings in the UK with an attendance of around 800-1000 national and international delegates. There is a trade exhibition with over 40 anaesthetics companies attending. Annual Congress is aimed all levels of anaesthetists from trainees to consultants and is a European CPD accredited meeting.

The society also hosts smaller events. These include the annual Trainee Conference, the leading trainee scientific meeting in the UK, aimed at all levels of trainee anaesthetists from CT1 to ST7. It has an attendance of around 400 delegates each year. The society also holds educational seminars designed to update on new developments in a specific field of interest within anaesthesia, critical care and pain medicine.

=== Heritage Centre ===
The Anaesthesia Heritage Centre contains the Association's archives, the Anaesthesia Museum and a rare book collection and is open to everyone.

The centre consists of a museum with a collection of over 4,500 objects dating back to 1774, the Association's own archives, which date back to 1932, and a reference library. The museum is a member of The London Museums of Health & Medicine.

== Research ==
=== Undergraduate Award ===
The Wylie Medal is awarded to the most meritorious essay on the topic related to anaesthesia, the topic for the essay question changes year on year. The award is open to undergraduate medical student at a university in Great Britain or Ireland. Prizes of £500, £250 and £150 are awarded to the best three submissions. The overall winners are given the Wylie Medal in memory of Dr W Derek Wylie, President of the Association 1980–82.

=== SAS Award ===
The Association invites applications for the SAS Audit Prize and the SAS Research Prize. These are exclusively for SAS doctors to encourage them to undertake audit and research. Entries will be judged by the Research & Grants Committee of the Association. All SAS doctors who are members of the Association are eligible to apply for the prize.

=== Innovation ===
The main aims of the Association's Innovation project are to promote innovation in anaesthesia and intensive care, to help individuals in their 'journey' from the concept to the finished product, to facilitate introduction to the medical equipment manufacturers or relevant organisation, to facilitate testing of new equipment or idea and to facilitate marketing of a new product or an idea. It involves holding workshops/clinics and seminars on the subject, having regular features in Anaesthesia News and the best innovations featured in Anaesthesia and having plenary or satellite sessions during Annual Congress and WSM London.

== Professionals ==
=== Trainees ===
The Association of Anaesthetists Trainee Committee (formerly known as GAT - Group of Anaesthetists in Training), is a section of the association which represents the interests of trainee anaesthetists across the UK and Ireland. Trainee members account for around one third of the total membership of the association. The Trainee Committee members are elected and has members sitting on the Board of Directors of the Association and representation on many other committees including the Intensive Care Society Trainee Committee and the British Medical Association Junior Doctors Committee.

=== SAS ===
Specialists, associate specialists and specialty (SAS) doctors are important members of any department, especially in Anaesthesia, and make an enormous contribution to the specialty. Doctors enter the SAS grade for many different reasons. Some enter from different training systems as the SAS route provides a means for secure employment and an alternative pathway for a medical career. The Association has grants and prizes designed especially for SAS doctors such as the SAS Audit, Research Prize and the SAS travel grant.

=== Consultants ===
The Association has around 10,000 members, the majority of whom are consultants.

== Publications ==
Anaesthesia is the society's official journal, with an international scope. It publishes original, peer-reviewed articles on all aspects of general and regional anaesthesia, intensive care and pain therapy, including research on equipment.

Anaesthesia Reports is another official journal, also with an international scope. It publishes original, peer-reviewed case reports, media content, and associated papers on all aspects of anaesthesia, peri-operative medicine, intensive care and pain therapy.

The association also publishes the newsletter Anaesthesia News. Regular features include reports from the officers and president, items specific to trainees, a history page, a specialist society page, letters to the editor and an editorial.

The association publishes guidelines on many topics relating to anaesthesia. Titles include: Best Practice in the Management of Epidural Analgesia in the Hospital Setting, Organising a Year Abroad, Good Anaesthetist - Standards of Practice for Career Grade Anaesthetists.

== Awards ==
Honorary Membership was instituted in 1932 at the time that the Association was founded. The society also awards the following:

- John Snow Silver Medal (instituted in 1946), in honour of John Snow
- The Pask Certificate of Honour (1977) after the Moorgate Underground disaster
- Sir Ivan Magill Gold Medal (1988) to commemorate the centenary of the birth of the pioneer anaesthetist Ivan Magill
- The Evelyn Baker medal (1998) for outstanding clinical competence
- The Featherstone Certificate (2001), in memory of the founder, Dr Henry Featherstone
- The Anniversary Medal (2007), for the 75th anniversary.
