= College of Anaesthesiologists of Ireland =

Irish professional association

- Coláiste Ainéistéiseolaithe na hÉireann
- Abbreviation: CAI
- Predecessor: Faculty of Anaesthetists, Royal College of Surgeons in Ireland
- Established: Faculty: 15 December 1959; 66 years ago College: 23 September 1998; 28 years ago
- Type: Professional association, educational institution
- Professional title: MCAI, FCAI
- Location: 22 Merrion Square North, Dublin 2, Ireland
- President: Prof Donal Buggy
- Chief Executive Officer: Mr Martin Mc Cormack
- Publication: British Journal of Anaesthesia; BJA Education
- Subsidiaries: Faculty of Pain Medicine, College of Anaesthesiologists of Ireland; Joint Faculty of Intensive Care Medicine of Ireland
- Website: anaesthesia.ie
- Formerly called: College of Anaesthetists, Royal College of Surgeons in Ireland; College of Anaesthetists of Ireland

The College of Anaesthesiologists of Ireland (CAI; Irish: Coláiste Ainéistéiseolaithe na hÉireann) is the professional association and educational institution responsible for the medical specialty of anaesthesiology throughout Ireland. It sets standards in anaesthesiology, critical care, and pain medicine, and for the training of anaesthesiologists, critical care physicians and pain medicine physicians. It also holds examinations for anaesthesiologists in training, jointly publishes the British Journal of Anaesthesia and BJA Education, and informs and educates the public about anaesthesiology. Its headquarters are in Dublin, Ireland.

Founded in 1959 as a faculty of the Royal College of Surgeons in Ireland (and therefore named the Faculty of Anaesthetists, Royal College of Surgeons in Ireland), the body's first dean was Dr Tom Gilmartin. It was reconstituted as a college in its own right in 1998 - although it initially remained under the aegis of the RCSI (as the College of Anaesthetists, Royal College of Surgeons in Ireland) - and it moved to its own premises in Merrion Square. The name was changed to College of Anaesthetists of Ireland on becoming fully independent. The present title was adopted in 2018, following a plebiscite of fellows, tying in with the specialty in Ireland being renamed from "anaesthesia" to the more international name of "anaesthesiology".
