= British Journal of Anaesthesia =

- Discipline: Anaesthesiology
- Language: English
- Edited by: Hugh C. Hemmings

Publication details
- History: 1923–present
- Publisher: Elsevier (United Kingdom)
- Frequency: Monthly
- Open access: Delayed, after 12 months
- Impact factor: 9.166 (2020)

Standard abbreviations
- ISO 4: Br. J. Anaesth.

Indexing
- CODEN: BJANAD
- ISSN: 0007-0912 (print); 1471-6771 (web)
- OCLC no.: 01537271

Links
- Journal homepage; Online access; Online archive

The British Journal of Anaesthesia is a monthly peer-reviewed medical journal published by Elsevier. It is affiliated with the Royal College of Anaesthetists (and its Faculty of Pain Medicine), the College of Anaesthesiologists of Ireland, and the Hong Kong College of Anaesthesiologists, for all of which it serves as their official journal.

The journal covers all aspects of anaesthesia, perioperative medicine, intensive care medicine, and pain management. The editor-in-chief is Hugh C. Hemmings (Weill Cornell Medical College). The journal was established in 1923, one year after the first anaesthetic journal (Anesthesia & Analgesia) was published by the International Anaesthesia Research Society. The first editor-in-chief was H.M. Cohen, who edited the journal from 1923 to 1928. Recent editors-in-chief include Ravi Mahajan (University of Nottingham), Charles Reilly (University of Sheffield), and Jennifer Hunter (University of Liverpool).

== BJA Education ==
BJA Education is a sister journal that was first established in 2001 as BJA CEPD Reviews; it was later renamed to Continuing Education in Anaesthesia, Critical Care & Pain in 2004, obtaining its current title in 2015.

== BJA Open ==
BJA Open is an open access sister journal that was established in 2021 and will cover the same subjects as the main journal. The editor-in-chief is Susan Goobie.

== Abstracting and indexing ==
The journal is abstracted and indexed in:

- Abstracts in Anthropology
- Biological Abstracts
- BIOSIS Previews
- Current Contents/Clinical Medicine
- Current Contents/Life Sciences
- Derwent Drug File
- Embase
- Index Medicus/MEDLINE/PubMed
- ProQuest
- Referativny Zhurnal
- Science Citation Index

According to the Journal Citation Reports, the journal has a 2020 impact factor of 9.166.

== Editors-in-chief ==
The following persons are or have been editor-in-chief:

- H.M. Cohen, 1923–1928
- J. Blomfield 1929–1948
- W. Faulkner Hill and T.C. Gray, 1948–1961
- J.E. Riding 1961–1973
- A.A. Spence 1973–1983
- W. Fitch 1983–1988
- G. Smith 1988–1997
- J.M. Hunter 1997–2005
- C.S. Reilly 2005–2013
- R. Mahajan 2013–2017
- H. Hemmings, Jr 2017–present
