= Royal College of Anaesthetists =

Professional body in the United Kingdom

- Abbreviation: RCoA
- Formation: Faculty 1948; 78 years ago College 1992; 34 years ago
- Type: Medical royal college
- Purpose: Anaesthesia, critical care, pain medicine
- Headquarters: Jubilee House; 20 Queen Elizabeth Street; London SE1 2LS; United Kingdom
- Coordinates: 51.31097°N 0.07106°W
- Region served: United Kingdom
- Members: 26,000 (2024)
- President: Claire Shannon
- CEO: Jonathan Brüün
- Patron: Anne, Princess Royal
- Affiliations: Academy of Medical Royal Colleges
- Staff: 118 (2019)
- Website: www.rcoa.ac.uk

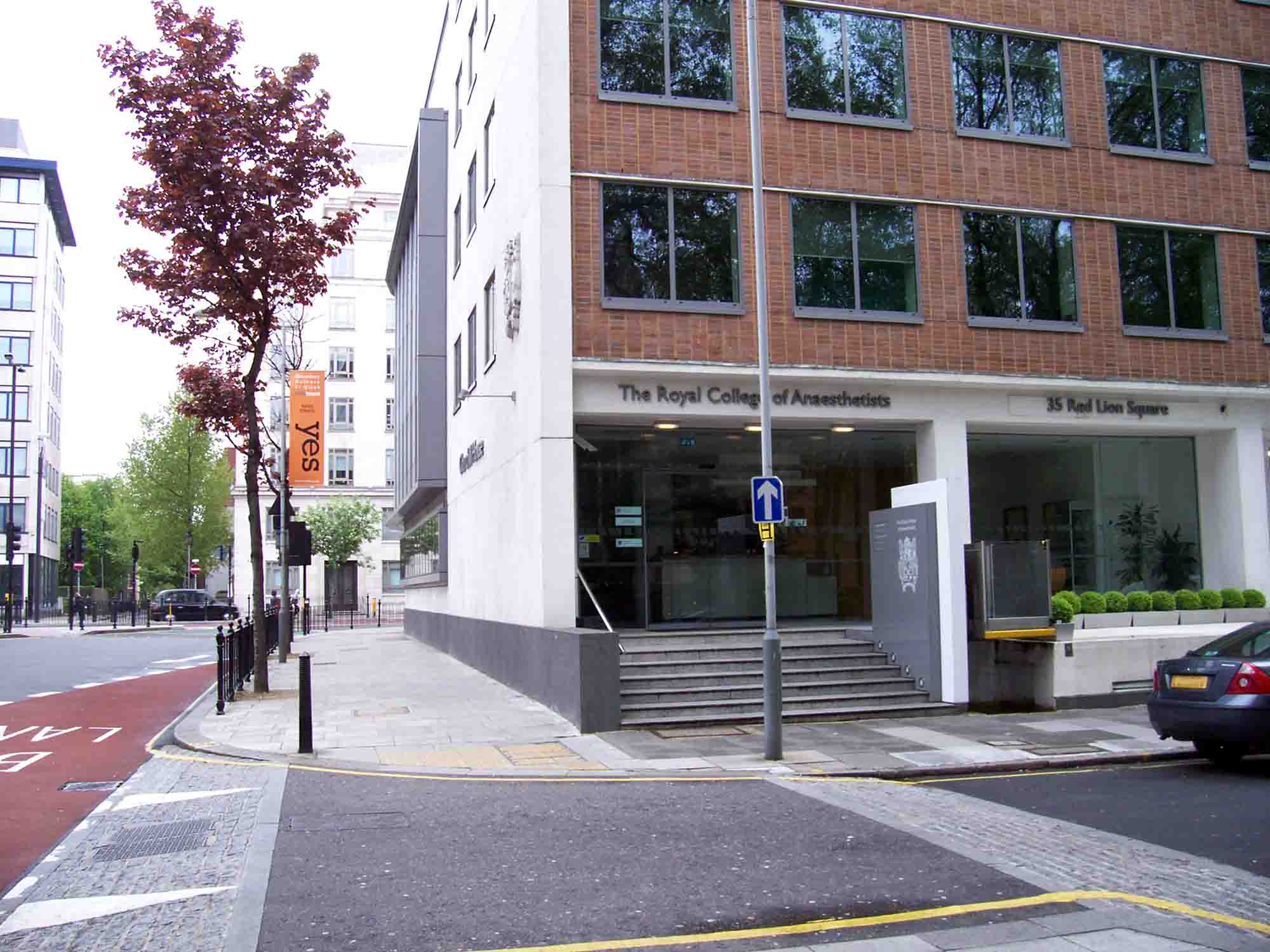
Churchill House, headquarters of the Royal College of Anaesthetists

The Royal College of Anaesthetists (RCoA) is the professional body responsible for the specialty of anaesthesia throughout the United Kingdom. It sets standards in anaesthesia, critical care, pain management, and for the training of anaesthetists, physicians' assistants (anaesthesia), and practising critical care physicians. It also holds examinations for anaesthetists in training, and informs and educates the public about anaesthesia. Its headquarters are in Churchill House, London.

== Role ==
The College's activities are varied, but include the setting of standards of clinical care, establishing the standards for the training of anaesthetists and those practising critical care and acute and chronic pain management, setting and running examinations, and the continued medical education of all practising anaesthetists.

== Publications ==
The College publishes guidance for its members and the GPAS standards. The College produces the Bulletin magazine, a quarterly member magazine.

== History ==
The Royal College of Anaesthetists was awarded its royal charter in 1992, making it one of the youngest Royal Colleges of medicine. Prior to this time, it had existed as the College of Anaesthetists since 1988, when it split from the Royal College of Surgeons of England. Prior to 1988, it was known as the Faculty of Anaesthetists of the Royal College of Surgeons of England, which was formed in 1948. The roots of the college can be traced back to the Association of Anaesthetists of Great Britain and Ireland (AAGBI), which was set up in 1932 by Henry Featherstone and others, and continues today. The AAGBI derived from the Section of Anaesthetics of the Royal Society of Medicine because that was not allowed to engage in 'political' or 'trade union' activities nor as an examining body.

== Coat of arms and motto ==
The coat of arms of the College shares some symbols and features with that of the Royal College of Surgeons of England. It also incorporates coca leaves to symbolise local anaesthesia, and opium poppy heads to symbolise sleep (the poppy head is symbolic of the Greek God Hypnos). The figures on either side of the shield (known as "supporters") are two pioneers of anaesthesia, John Snow and Joseph Thomas Clover. The College's motto is "Divinum sedare dolorem" (it is divine to alleviate pain).

== Examinations ==
- Diploma of Anaesthesia ('DA' - now defunct)
- Fellowship of the Royal College of Anaesthetists (divided into the Primary FRCA and Final FRCA)

== Organisation ==
The College is made up from an elected Council of practising anaesthetists who elect a President and two Vice-Presidents from among their members. Particular areas of work are considered by Committees who report to the Council. As of September 2021, the President is Dr Fiona Donald and the Vice-Presidents are Dr Russell Perkins and Dr Helgi Johannsson. The patron of the Royal College of Anaesthetists is The Princess Royal.

== Deans and presidents ==
Deans and presidents of the Faculty, College and Royal College are listed below with terms of office in brackets.

=== Deans ===
- Archibald D. Marston (1948–1952)
- Bernard Johnson (1952–1955)
- Frankis T. Evans (1955–1958)
- Sir Geoffrey Organe (1958–1961)
- William W. Mushin (1961–1964)
- T. Cecil Gray (1964–1967)
- W. Derek Wylie (1967–1970)
- Cyril F. Scurr (1970–1973)
- Gordon Robson (1973–1976)
- J. Edmund Riding (1976–1979)
- John F. Nunn (1979–1982)
- Donald Campbell (1982–1985)
- Aileen K Adams (1985–1988)

=== Presidents ===
- Michael Rosen (1988–1991)
- Alastair Spence (1991–1994)
- Cedric Prys-Roberts (1994–1997)
- Leo Strunin (1997–2000)
- Peter Hutton (2000–2003)
- Sir Peter Simpson (2003–2006)
- Judith Hulf (2006–2009)
- Peter Nightingale (2009–2012)
- J. P. van Besouw (2012–2015)
- Liam Brennan (2015–2018)
- Ravi Mahajan (2018–2021)
- Fiona Donald (2021–2024)
- Claire Shannon (2024–present)
