= Bronchial blocker =

Medical device

An bronchial blocker (also called endobronchial blocker) is a device which can be inserted down a tracheal tube after tracheal intubation so as to block off the right or left main bronchus of the lungs in order to be able to achieve a controlled one sided ventilation of the lungs in thoracic surgery. The lung tissue distal to the obstruction will collapse, thus allowing the surgeon's view and access to relevant structures within the thoracic cavity.

Bronchial blockers are used to achieve lung separation and one lung ventilation as an alternative to double-lumen endotrachealtubes (DLT) and are the method of choice in children and paediatric patients for whom even the smallest DLTs might be too big.

== Types ==
=== Univent tube ===
Made by Fuji Systems, Tokyo, Japan, is a tracheal tube with a second lumen that contains a coaxial, balloon tipped catheter which can be advanced under fiber optic bronchoscopy and blocked in either bronchus.

=== Arndt endobronchial blocker ===
Produced by Cook Critical Care, Bloomington, USA, is a catheter with a balloon tip and inner lumen which contains a flexible wire which is coupled to a fiber optical bronchoscope to guide the device into the desired bronchus.

=== Cohen endobronchial blocker ===
By Cook Critical Care, is a catheter shaft with a distal soft nylon flexible tip and balloon which can be deflected by 90° to guide the device into either bronchus.

=== Coopdech bronchial blocker ===
By Smith Medical, Rosmalen, NL, has a preformed angulation at the distal tip to aid placement in the desired bronchus.

=== EZ-blocker ===
By Teleflex Inc., USA, a Y-shaped bronchial blocker with two distal extensions to be placed in both main stem bronchi.

== See also ==
- Combitube
- Endotracheal tube
- Airtraq
- Laryngeal tube
