= Double-lumen endobronchial tube =

Tube for one-sided lung ventilation

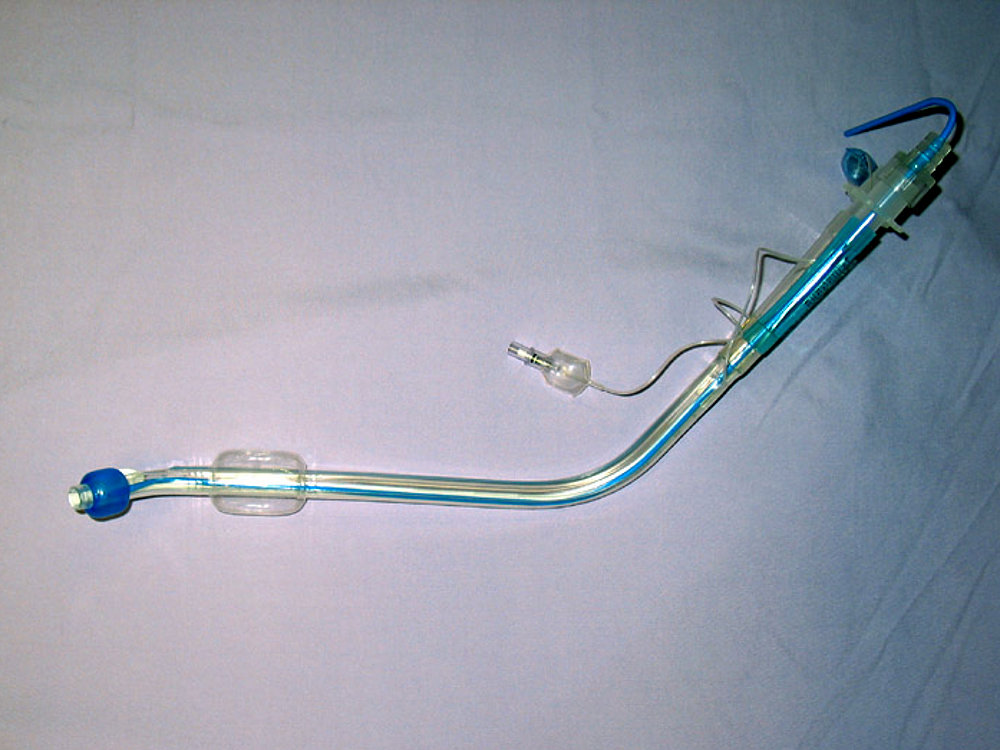
A Carlens double-lumen endotracheal tube, commonly used for thoracic surgical operations such as VATS lobectomy.

A double-lumen endotracheal tube (also called double-lumen endobronchial tube or DLT) is a type of endotracheal tube which is used in tracheal intubation during thoracic surgery and other medical conditions to achieve selective, one-sided ventilation of either the right or the left lung.

== Indications ==
There are several conditions that may make one-sided lung ventilation necessary. Absolute indications include separation of the right from the left lung to avoid spillage of blood or pus from an infected or bleeding side to the unaffected side. Relative indications include the collapse of one lung and the selective ventilation of the remaining lung in order to facilitate exposure of the anatomical structures to be operated on in thoracic surgeries, such as the repair of a thoracic aortic aneurysm, pneumonectomy or lobectomy.

== Development and description ==
A DLT is made up of two small-lumen endotracheal tubes of unequal length fixed side by side. The shorter tube ends in the trachea while the longer one is placed in either the left or right bronchus in order to selectively ventilate the left or right lung respectively. The first double-lumen tube used for bronchospirometry and later for one-lung anaesthesia in humans was introduced by Carlens in 1949. Modifications to the original Carlens tube have been introduced by White, Robertshaw and others. The most commonly used DLT today is the Robertshaw tube (introduced in 1962). These allow single-lung ventilation while the other lung is collapsed to make thoracic surgery easier or possible. This may be necessary so as to facilitate the surgeon's view and access to relevant structures within the thoracic cavity. The deflated lung is re-inflated as surgery finishes to check for leakages or other injuries.

These tubes are typically coaxial, with two separate channels and two separate openings. They incorporate an endotracheal lumen which terminates in the trachea and an endobronchial lumen, the distal tip of which is positioned 1–2 cm into the right or left mainstem bronchus.

Proper placement of DLTs requires considerable clinical experience, various techniques for their insertion having been developed. And there is a small simulator to help in the training of Carlens tube rotation maneuvers.

Placement has been found to be easier with the aid of fiber optical equipment such as a bronchoscope. Currently, flexible fiberoptic bronchoscopy examination is recommended before, during placement, and at the conclusion of the use of DLTs.

== Alternatives ==
Other methods of achieving a one sided lung ventilation are the Univent tube, which has a single tracheal lumen and blocker, and other endobronchial blockers.

The approach to ventilating each lung via a separate ventilator is called the DuoVent approach. This system operates by connecting both ventilators to a master control unit, allowing for synchrony between the two ventilators.

== See also ==
- Combitube
- Endotracheal tube
- Airtraq
- Laryngeal tube
