= Breathing tube =

A breathing tube is a hollow component that can serve as a conduit for breathing. Various types of breathing tubes are available for different specific applications. Many of them are generally known by more specific terms.

Breathing tube may also refer to, or be part of:

== Anatomy ==
- Vertebrate trachea, also known as the "windpipe", a tube present in tetrapods that connects the pharynx or larynx to the lungs, allowing the passage of breathing gas (most commonly air)
- Invertebrate trachea, the open respiratory system employed by most terrestrial arthropods to transport metabolic gases to and from tissues
- Siphon, a tube-like structure through which water or air may flow for one or more purposes such as locomotion, feeding, respiration, and reproduction
- Siphon (insect anatomy), a tubular organ of the respiratory system of some insects that spend a significant amount of their time underwater, that serves as a breathing tube

== Medical applications ==
- Anesthesia breathing circuit, a system of breathing hoses which may be connected to a mask, laryngeal mask airway or tracheal tube to support the administration of anaesthesia
- Anesthetic machine, a machine which may be connected to a mask, laryngeal mask airway or tracheal tube to support the administration of anaesthesia
- Bag valve mask, a device which may be connected to a mask, laryngeal mask airway or tracheal tube to mechanically move breatheable air into and out of the lungs
- Blind insertion airway device, curved tube for ventiliation
- Laryngeal mask airway, a supraglottic airway device used in anesthesia and in emergency medicine for airway management
- Medical ventilator, a machine which may be connected to a mask, laryngeal mask airway or tracheal tube to mechanically move breatheable air into and out of the lungs
- Nasal cannula, a lightweight tube which on one end splits into two prongs which are placed in the nostrils to deliver supplemental oxygen or airflow
- Tracheal tube, a device that is inserted into the trachea to establish and maintain an airway

== Underwater applications ==
- Snorkel, a J-shaped rubber or plastic tube fitted with a mouthpiece at the lower end, used for breathing air from above the water surface when the wearer's mouth and nose are submerged, usually referred to as a snorkel
- Breathing tube (breathing apparatus), a flexible tube in a scuba set or other breathing apparatus, more commonly referred to as a breathing hose.
- Surface-supplied diving, a hose used to connect a surface-supplied diver to a supply of breathing gas remotely provided on a diving support vessel or diving bell, often combined with other services in a bundle referred to as an "umbilical cable", more accurately referred to as the primary or main gas supply hose or air hose. When used alone it is often called the air line.
- Snuba, an underwater breathing system in which breathing gas is supplied through a long hose from tanks on pontoon rafts on the surface of the water, usually referred to as the air hose.

== Aviation and space applications ==
- Primary Life Support System (PLSS), a machine that provides breathing gas, removes exhaled carbon dioxide and water, regulates atmospheric pressure, and monitors certain physiologic parameters within a space suit

== Military and industrial applications ==
- Component of some types of Self-contained breathing apparatus (SCBA), a device worn by rescue workers, firefighters, and others to provide breathable air in an IDLH (Immediate Danger to Life and Health) atmosphere
- Component of some types of Gas mask, a device designed to be worn over the face to protect the wearer from inhaling airborne pollutants and toxic gases
- Component of some types of Respirator, a device designed to protect the wearer from inhaling harmful dusts, fumes, vapors, and/or gases
