= BIAD =

BIAD may refer to:

- Blind insertion airway device, a medical device for securing the patients airway
- Birmingham Institute of Art and Design, a British university art and design teaching and research centre
