= David S. Sheridan =

David S. Sheridan (10 July 1908, Brooklyn – 29 April 2004, Argyle, New York) was the inventor of the "disposable" plastic endotracheal tube.

David was the second of six sons of Adolf and Anna Sockolof, who immigrated to the United States from Russia. He changed his name from Sockolof to Sheridan in 1939. He attended school until 8th grade when he went to work with his father and brothers in the hardwood flooring business.

David Sheridan was the inventor of the modern "disposable" plastic endotracheal tube now used routinely in surgery. Previous to his invention, red rubber tubes were used, then sterilized, and re-used which often lead to the spread of disease and also a high risk of infection. Sheridan is thus credited with saving thousands of lives.

He held more than 50 medical instrument patents and is credited with inventing the modern disposable catheter in the 1940s. In his lifetime he started and sold four catheter companies and was dubbed the "Catheter King" by Forbes magazine in 1988.

Sheridan died in upstate New York at the age of 95. The Argyle community dedicated a memorial to David and his wife Janet in October 2009 for their many contributions to the community and for their years of public service. A portion of State Route 40 within Argyle Village was renamed Sheridan Street in David's honor.

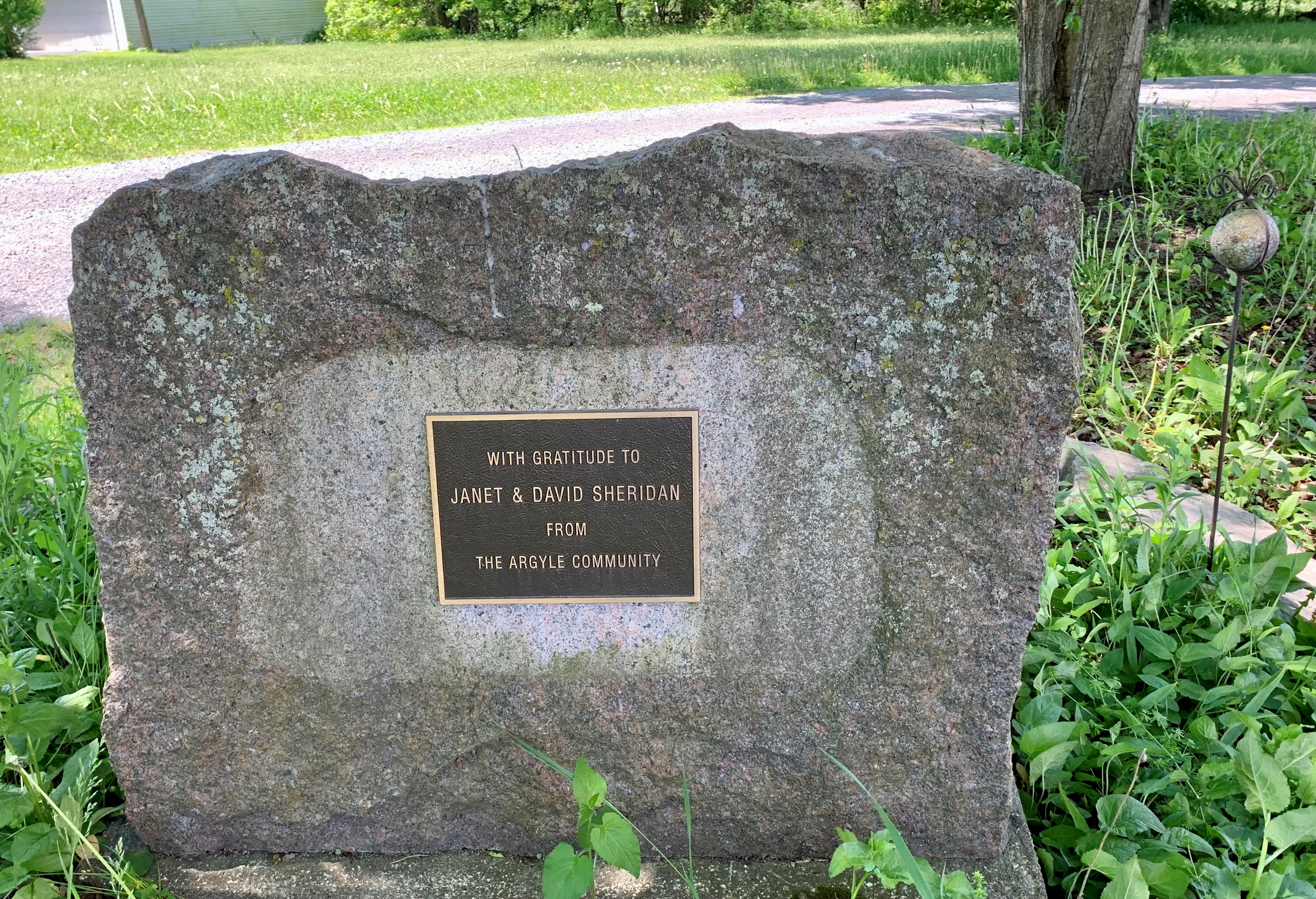
David and Janet Sheridan Memorial Stone dedicated October 2009 in Argyle, New York.

== Books ==
- W. C. Heinz (1988). Inventor: The Dave Sheridan Story. Albany, NY: The Albany Medical Center.
