= Blind insertion airway device =

Airway devices blindly inserted

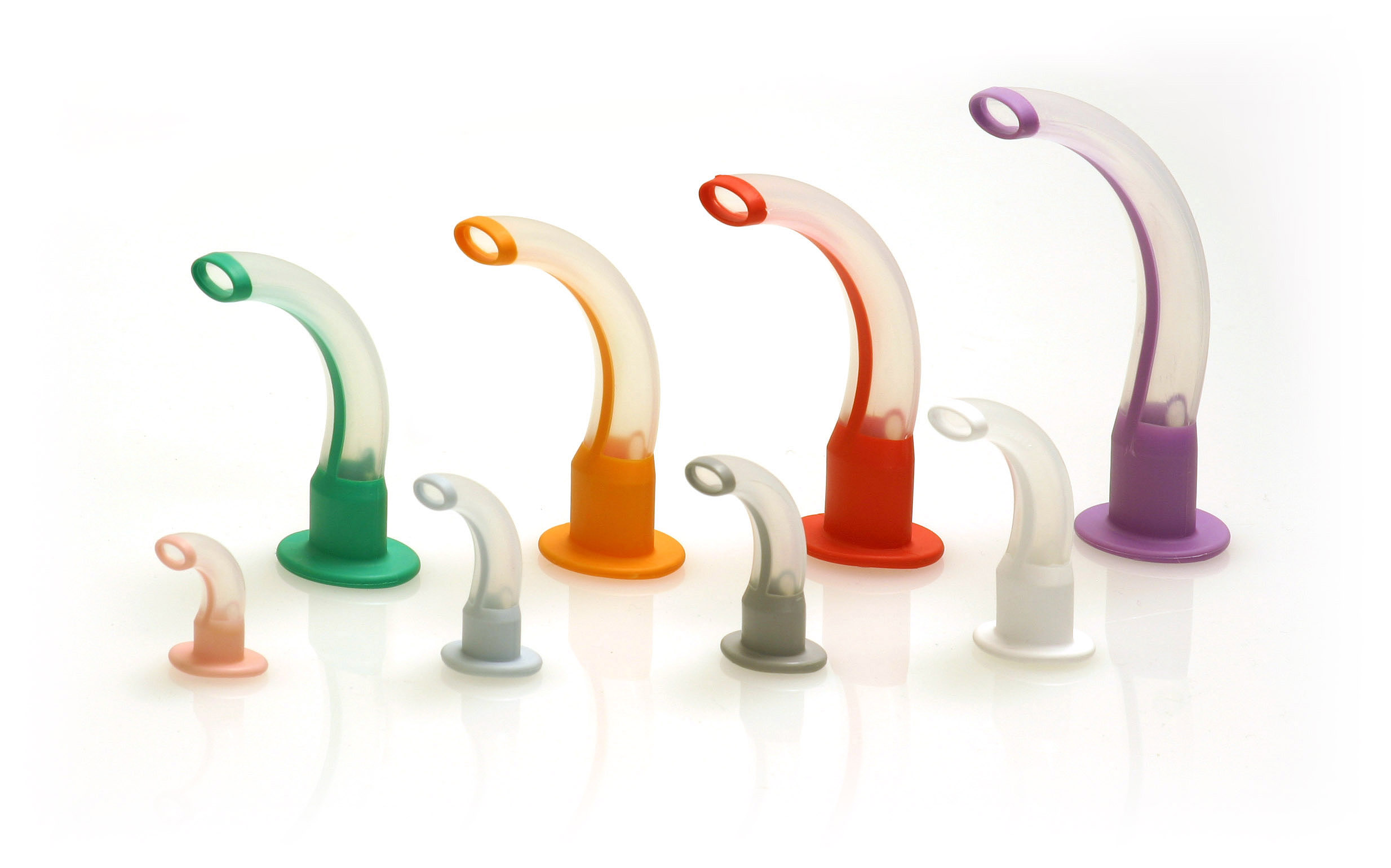
Oropharyngeal airways are one of several different blind insertion airway devices

A blind insertion airway device (BIAD or blind insertion device) is a medical device used for airway management that ensures an open pathway between a patient's lungs and the outside world, as well as reducing the risk of aspiration, which can be placed without visualization of the glottis. Blind insertion airway devices are often used in the pre-hospital and emergency setting.

While the term blind insertion airway device does not refer to an endotracheal tube, it too can also be blindly inserted in certain circumstances, or inserted using a BIAD as a conduit for an endotracheal tube, or by using a bougie or airway exchange catheter.

Blind insertion devices have a number of limitations compared to endotracheal intubation; firstly, the risk of aspiration is higher when using a blind insertion device.

Examples of blind insertion airway devices are:

- Combitube
- EasyTube
- Laryngeal tube
- Laryngeal mask airway (a supraglottic airway device)
- Nasopharyngeal airway
- Oropharyngeal airway

== Additional images ==
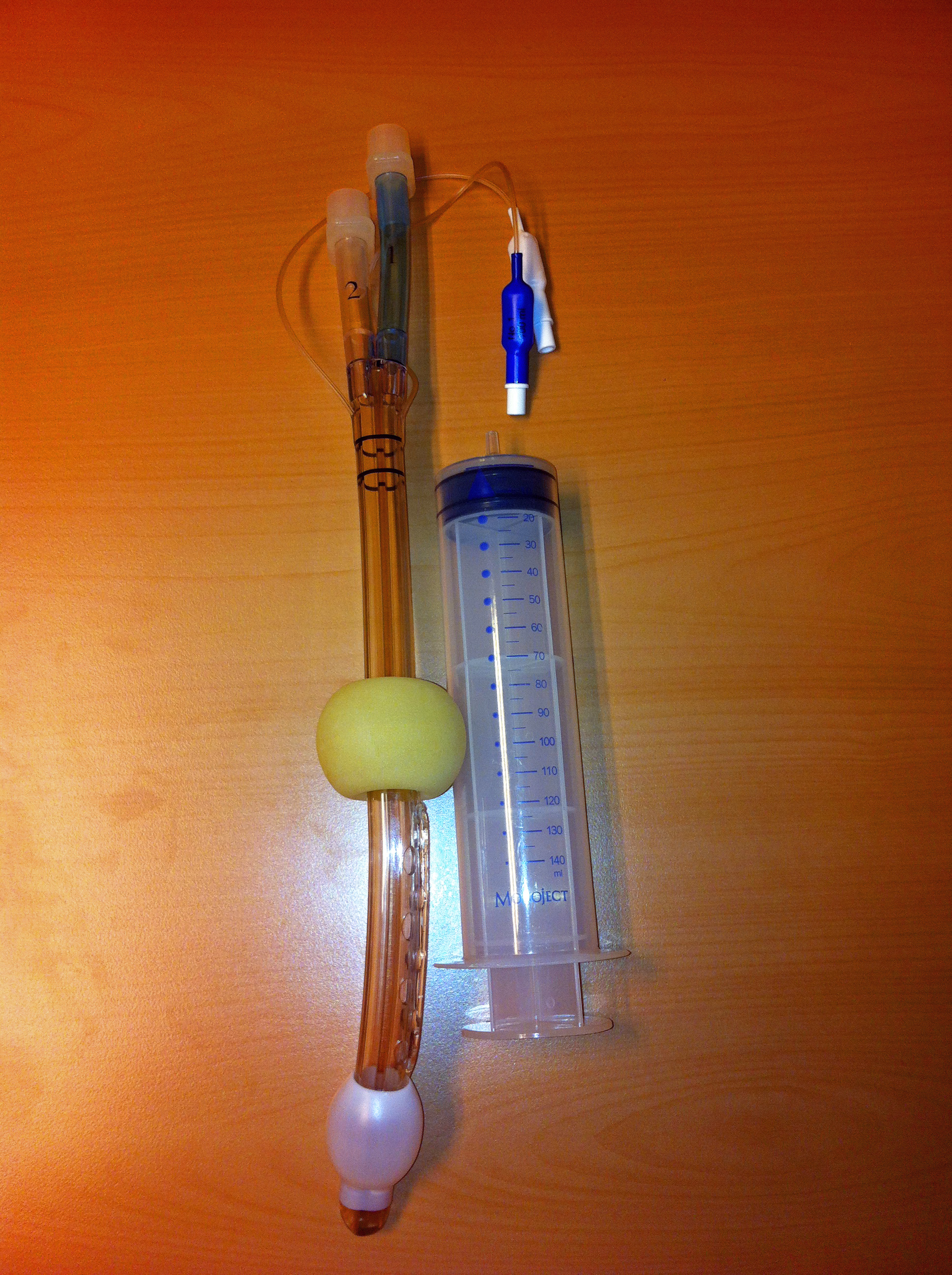
A combitube.

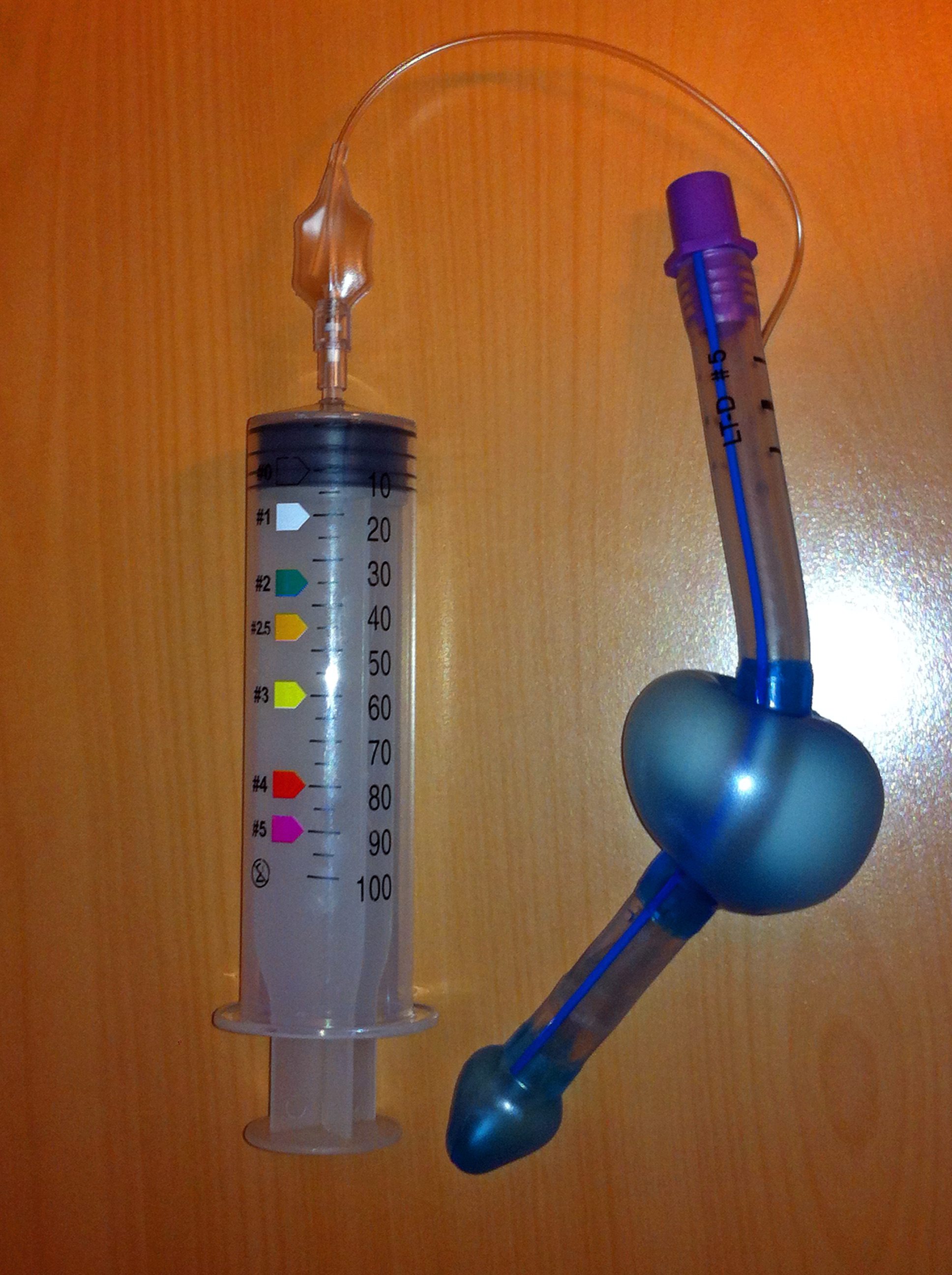
A laryngeal tube

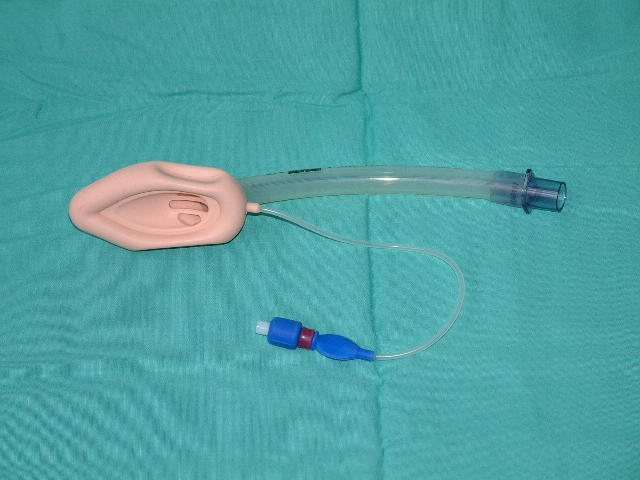
A laryngeal mask.

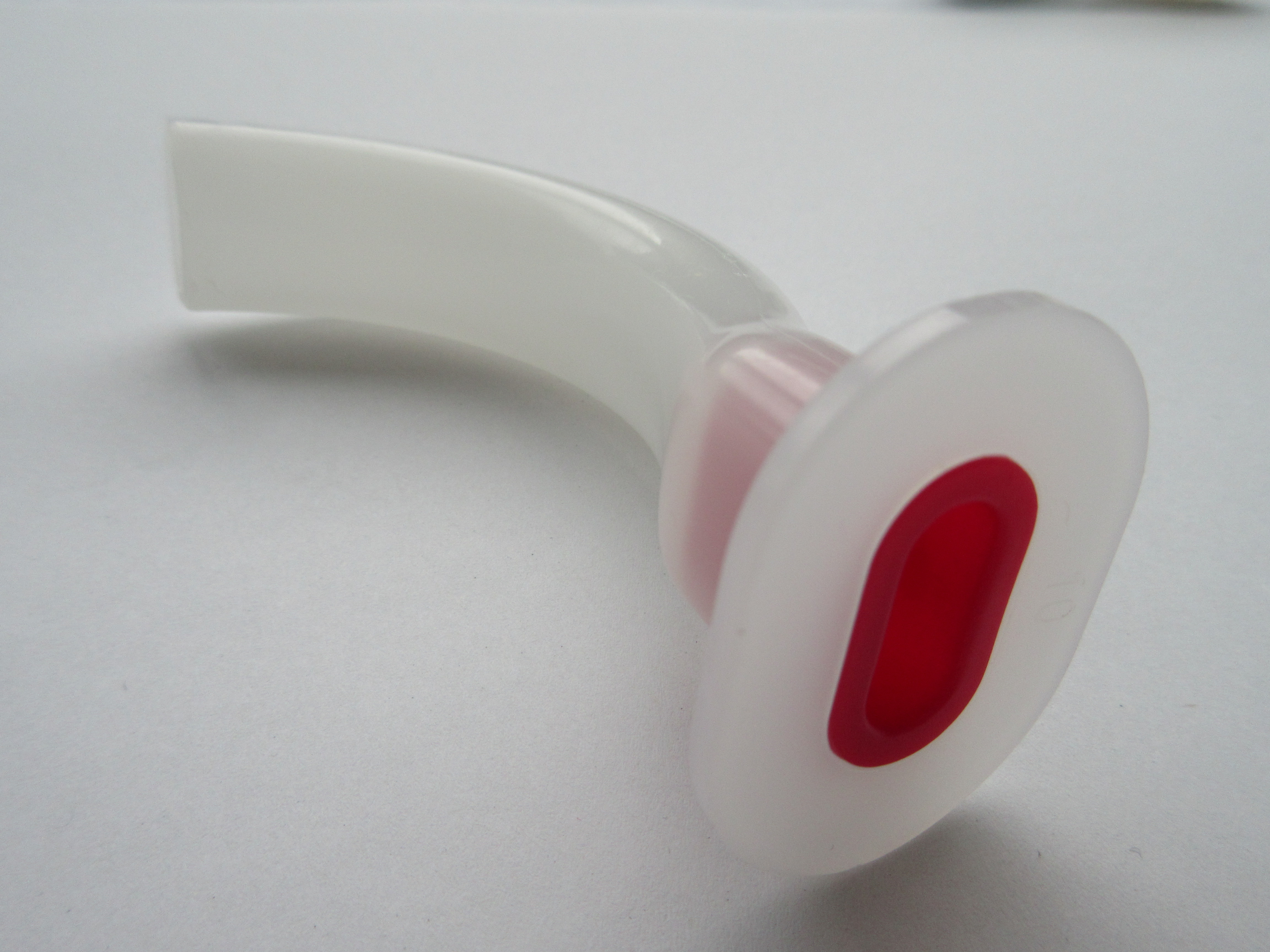
Oropharyngeal airway

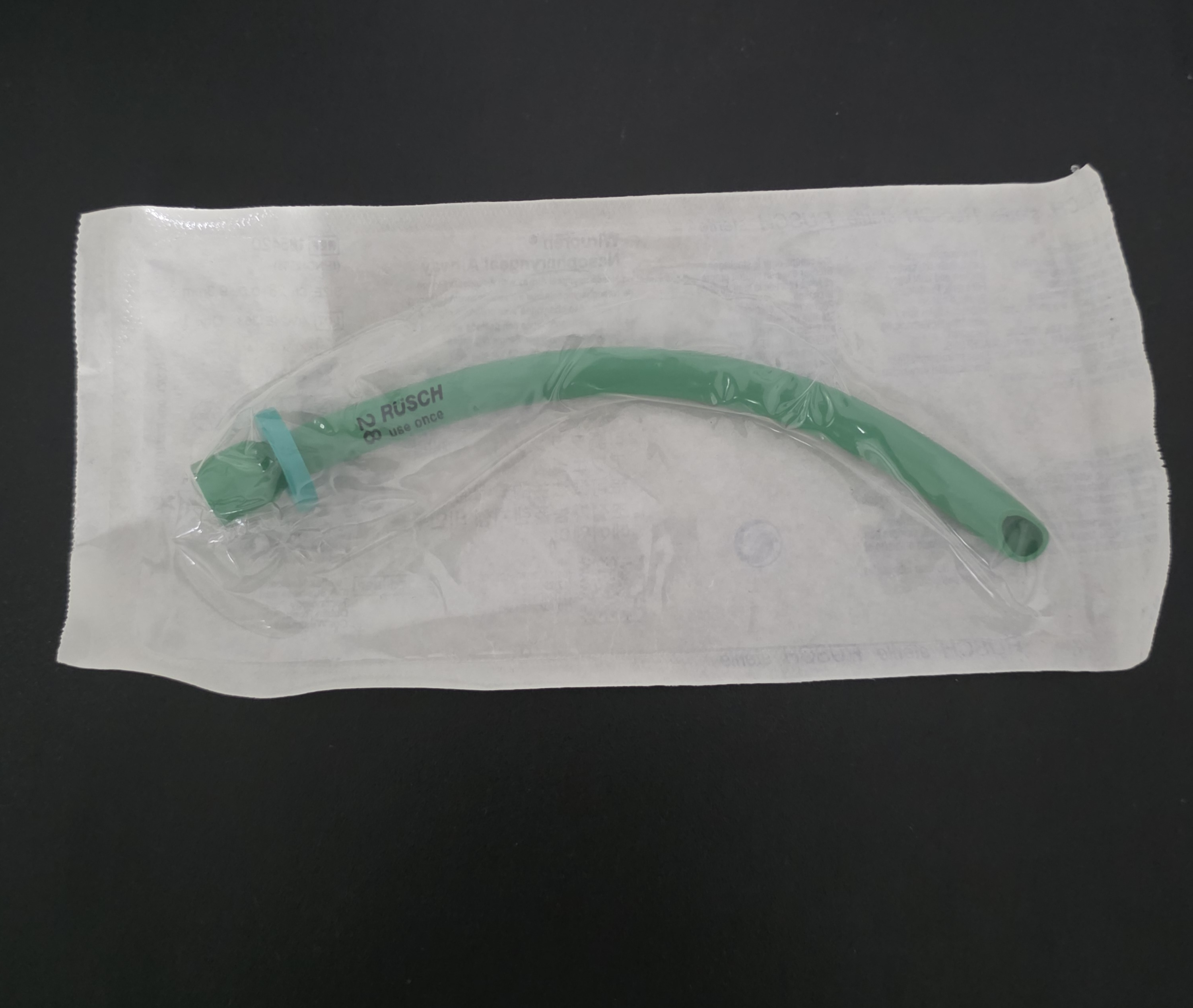
Nasopharyngeal Airway
