= Airtraq =

Device used for tracheal intubation

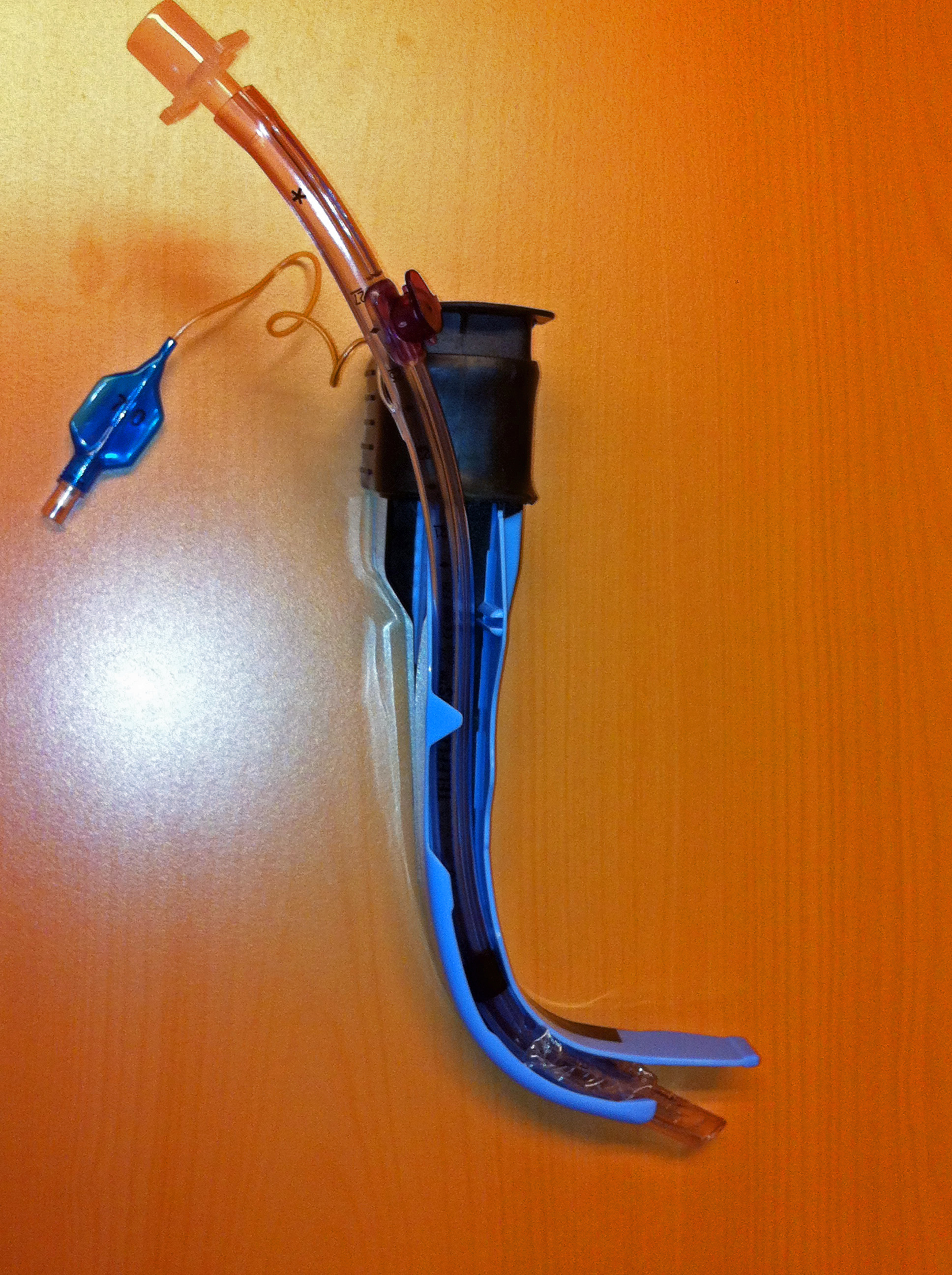
- Airtraq large adult size 3
- Specialty: Anesthesiology, Emergency medicine
- Intervention: tracheal intubation
- Inventor(s): Pedra A. Gandarias
- Manufacturer: Prodol Meditec S.A., Vizcaya, Spain
- [edit on Wikidata]

Airtraq is a fibreoptic intubation device used for indirect (video or optic assisted) tracheal intubation in difficult airway situations. It is designed to enable a view of the glottic opening without aligning the oral with the pharyngeal, and laryngeal axes as an advantage over direct endotracheal intubation and allows for intubation with minimal head manipulation and positioning.

== Description ==
Airtraq was developed by Pedra A. Gandarias and produced and marketed by Prodol Meditec S.A., Vizcaya, Spain. The standard Airtraq is a disposable article with an eyepiece optic, while the AirtraqAvant allows re-use of the optical system as well as external video monitoring and recording. The Airtraq blade is anatomically formed, with a battery-powered light source at the tip of the blade. The battery power reserve is sufficient to power the bulb for 90 minutes, according to the product information. The light bulb is designed to reach an operating temperature of 40 °C in order to suppress fogging of the optical system. The visual image is transmitted from a lens at the distal tip of the blade to the optical eyepiece (or monitor) via a series of prisms and mirrors. Apart from the integrated optical system, the handle and blade of the Airtraq laryngoscope also contain a channel for the placement and insertion of the endotracheal tube.

The Airtraq laryngoscope is available in four sizes ranging from Infant (size 0) to large Adult (size 3). The large adult size requires a minimal mouth opening of 18 mm. Any type of endotracheal tube can be used with the Airtraq. Endotracheal tubes of inner diameter (ID) sizes 7.0 mm to 8.5 mm can be used with the large adult size.

== Use and efficacy ==
The light source of the Airtraq is turned on at least 30 seconds before use to allow the anti-fogging device and lightsource to reach optimal operation temperature. Unlike in direct laryngoscopy, where the laryngoscope blade is inserted into the mouth laterally, the Airtraq is inserted into the mouth in the mid line and passed over the center of the tongue. While some sources state that the use of the Airtaq is easy and can be adequately and quickly learned by novice personnel, other sources caution that the clinical learning process of the Airtraq laryngoscope is much longer than reported in the literature. The Airtraq has been found to be advantageous over conventional direct laryngoscopy in situations were the cervical spine has been immobilized by a spine board or cervical collar, with movement of the cervical spine being reduced by between 44% and 66% while using the Airtraq.

== See also ==
- Laryngeal tube
- Combitube
- Tracheal tube
