= Combitube =

Device used to provide an airway

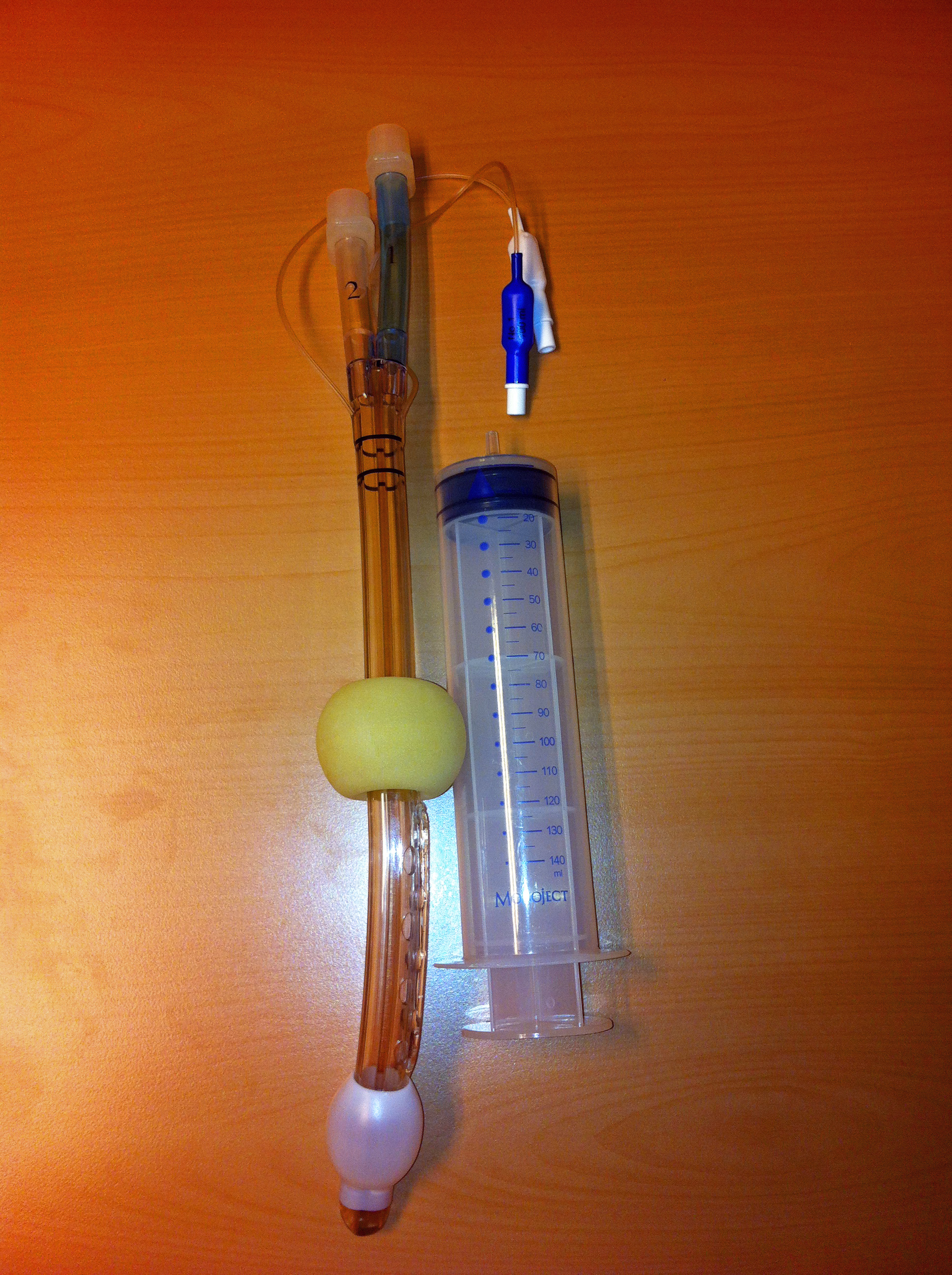
- Synonyms: esophageal tracheal airway, esophageal tracheal double-lumen airway
- Specialty: Anesthesiology, Emergency medicine
- Intervention: Airway management
- Related items: laryngeal mask airway, laryngeal tube
- [edit on Wikidata]

The Combitube—also known as the esophageal tracheal airway or esophageal tracheal double-lumen airway—is a blind insertion airway device (BIAD) used in the pre-hospital and emergency setting. It is designed to provide an airway to facilitate the mechanical ventilation of a patient in respiratory distress.

== Description and use ==
It consists of a cuffed, double-lumen tube that is inserted through the patient's mouth to secure an airway and enable ventilation. Generally, the distal tube (tube two, clear) enters the esophagus, where the cuff is inflated and ventilation is provided through the proximal tube (tube one, blue) which opens at the level of the larynx. In the rare instance where the distal tube intubates the trachea, ventilation is provided through the distal tube. Inflation of the cuff in the esophagus allows a level of protection against aspiration of gastric content similar to that found in the laryngeal mask.

The simplicity of placement is the main advantage of the Combitube over endotracheal intubation. When intubating with a traditional endotracheal tube, care must be taken to visually ensure that the tube has been placed in the trachea while the dual-lumen design of the Combitube allows for ventilation to proceed regardless of esophageal or tracheal placement.

A device called the Positube, which allows for esophageal intubation detection, can be used on tube number two to rule out the intubation of the Combitube in the trachea. The Positube checks for air flow resistance on tube number two and is very helpful in checking proper Combitube placement when intubation is performed in noisy environments.

The Combitube's ease of use makes it an option for use in the pre-hospital, emergency setting when advanced level providers capable of placing an endotracheal tube are not immediately available. The drawbacks of Combitubes are evidenced by reports of serious complications such as aspiration, esophagus perforation and cranial nerve dysfunction associated with their use.

While it has been suggested as an option by the American Heart Association and European Resuscitation Council for situations where intubation attempts are unsuccessful since the year 2000, it is seldom used outside of the pre-hospital, emergency setting, as it does not allow for long term airway control. Alternatives to the Combitube include the laryngeal mask airway, the endotracheal tube, and the laryngeal tube.

== See also ==
- Laryngeal tube
- Endotracheal tube
- Airtraq
