= Laryngeal tube =

Type of airway management device

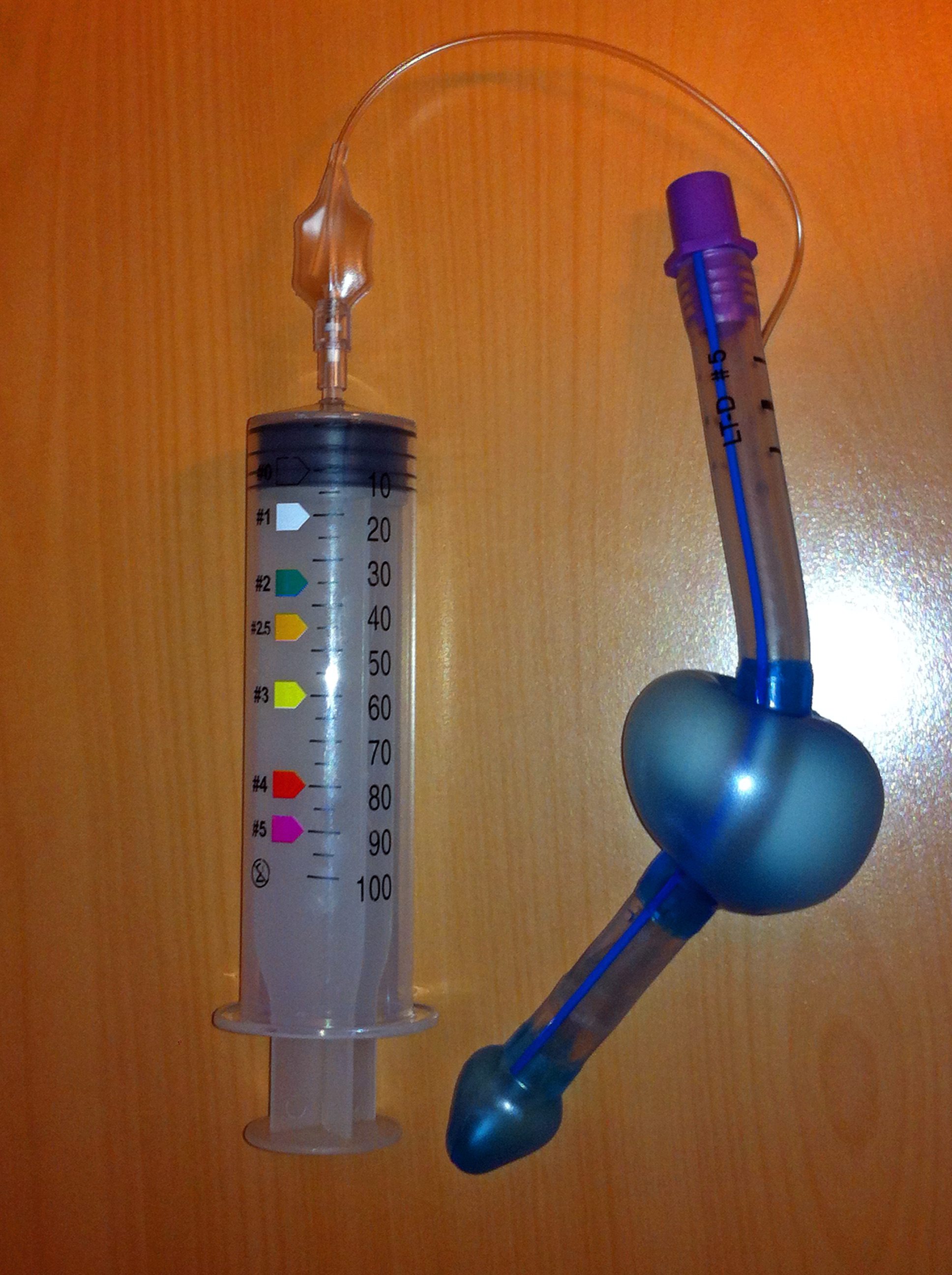
- Standard Laryngeal Tube size 5 (VBM Medizintechnik, Sulz, Germany) with the syringe for cuff inflation
- Synonyms: King LT
- Specialty: Anesthesiology, Emergency medicine
- Intervention: Airway management
- Invention date: 1999
- Manufacturer: VBM Medizintechnik
- Related items: Laryngeal mask airway
- [edit on Wikidata]

The laryngeal tube (also known as the King LT) is an airway management device designed as an alternative to other airway management techniques such as mask ventilation, laryngeal mask airway, and tracheal intubation. This device can be inserted blindly through the oropharynx into the hypopharynx to create an airway during anaesthesia and cardiopulmonary resuscitation so as to enable mechanical ventilation of the lungs.

== Medical use ==
Various studies have shown that insertion and use of the standard tracheal tube is easy, providing a clear airway in the majority of cases. Comparative studies indicate that the standard laryngeal tube is generally as effective as the laryngeal mask airway, while some studies indicate that the Pro-seal laryngeal mask may be more effective than the standard laryngeal tube under controlled ventilation conditions in general anaesthesia. The indications and contraindications for use of the laryngeal tube are similar to those of the laryngeal mask airway and include the use in general anaesthesia for minor surgical operations. Several studies describe the usefulness of the device in securing a difficult airway, even in cases where insertion of the laryngeal mask had failed. The double-lumen laryngeal tube-Suction II, with the possibility of placing a gastric tube, has been found to have distinct advantages over the standard laryngeal tube and has been recommended as a first-line device to secure the airway in emergency situations when direct laryngoscopy fails in neonates and infants. The laryngeal tube is also recommended for medical personnel not experienced in tracheal intubation, and as a rescue device when intubation has failed in adults. According to the manufacturer the use of Laryngeal tubes is contraindicated in people with an intact gag reflex, known oesophageal disease, and people who have ingested caustic substances.

== Description ==
In its basic (standard) version, the laryngeal tube is made up of a tube with a larger balloon cuff in the middle (oropharyngeal cuff) and a smaller balloon cuff at the end (oesophageal cuff). The tube is kinked at an angle of 30-45° in the middle; the kink is located in the larger cuff. There are two apertures, located between the two cuffs, through which ventilation takes place. Both cuffs are inflated through a single small lumen line and pilot balloon. The cuffs are high-volume, low-pressure cuffs with inflating volume ranging from 10 ml (size 0) to 90 ml (size 5). A large bore syringe, which is marked with the required volume for each size, is used to inflate the cuffs. A cuff inflator can also be used, in which case the cuffs should be inflated to a pressure of 60 cm H_{2}O. Three black lines on the tube indicate the depth of insertion when aligned with the teeth.

== History ==
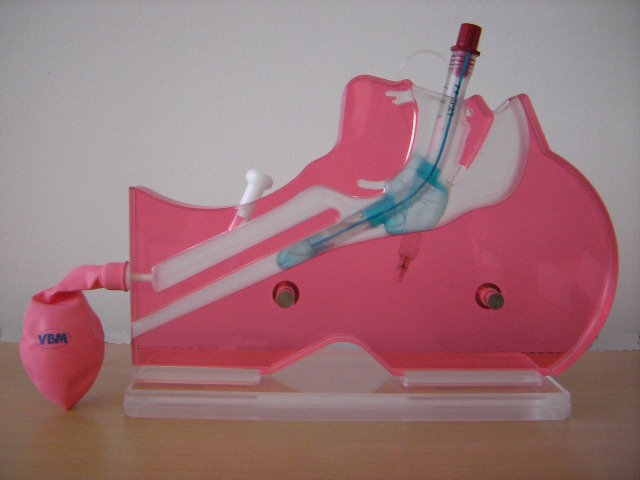
Laryngeal tube placement in glass model

The laryngeal tube was developed in Germany and introduced to the European market by VBM Medizintechnik in the autumn of 1999. Since then the design has been modified several times. Currently four different models are used: the standard tube as single use or re-use models and the modified tube (laryngeal tube-Suction II) as single use or re-use models. The re-usable models can be autoclaved up to 50 times, while the modified laryngeal tube (Suction) incorporates an extra lumen for inserting a gastric tube or suction system. There are six sizes of the laryngeal tube, ranging from newborn (size 0) to large adult (size 5). The connector of the tube is color-coded for each size. The different sizes are calibrated according to weight or height.

The laryngeal tube was licensed for use during cardiopulmonary resuscitation in Japan in 2002, and approved for use in the United States by the Food and Drug Administration in 2003. The European Resuscitation Council, in its 2005 guidelines for advanced life support (ALS), accepts its use as an alternate airway device for medical personnel who are not experienced in tracheal intubation.

== See also ==
- Combitube
- Endotracheal tube
- Airtraq
- Double-lumen endo-bronchial tube
