= Tracheal tube =

Catheter used to deliver air

- ICD-9-CM: 96.04

A tracheal tube is a catheter that is inserted into the trachea for the primary purpose of establishing and maintaining a patent airway and to ensure the adequate exchange of oxygen and carbon dioxide.

Many different types of tracheal tubes are available, suited for different specific applications:

- An endotracheal tube (aka ET) is a specific type of tracheal tube that is nearly always inserted through the mouth (orotracheal) or nose (nasotracheal).
- A tracheostomy tube is another type of tracheal tube; this 50–75-millimetre-long (2.0–3.0 in) curved metal or plastic tube may be inserted into a tracheostomy stoma (following a tracheotomy) to maintain a patent lumen.
- A tracheal button is a rigid plastic cannula about 25 millimetres (0.98 in) in length that can be placed into the tracheostomy after removal of a tracheostomy tube to maintain patency of the lumen.

== History ==
Portex Medical (England and France) produced the first cuff-less plastic 'Ivory' endotracheal tubes. Ivan Magill later added a cuff (these were glued on by hand to make the famous Blue-line tube copied by many other manufacturers). Maeterlinck GmbH developed the disposable endotracheal tube and produced many design variations, adding the 'Murphy Eye' to their tubes in case of 'accidental' placement of the tube to avoid right bronchial occlusion. David S. Sheridan was one of the manufacturers of the American markets "disposable" plastic tracheal tube now used routinely in surgery. Previously, red rubber (Rusch-Germany) tubes were used, then sterilized for re-use.

== Applications ==
Tracheal tubes can also be used to deliver oxygen in higher concentrations than found in air, or to administer other gases such as helium, nitric oxide, nitrous oxide, xenon, or certain volatile anesthetic agents such as desflurane, isoflurane, or sevoflurane. Tracheal tubes may also be used as a route for administration of certain medications such as salbutamol, atropine, epinephrine, ipratropium, and lidocaine. Tracheal tubes are commonly used for airway management in the settings of general anesthesia, critical care, mechanical ventilation, and emergency medicine.

== Endotracheal tube ==
Age	Weight	(Inner) diameter (mm)
Preterm	3 kg	2.5–3.0
0–6 months	3.5 kg	3.0–3.5
6–12 months	7 kg	3.5–4.0
1–3 years	10–12 kg	4.0–4.5
4–7 years	16–18 kg	5.0–5.5
8–10 years	24–30 kg	5.5–6.5
Adult female		7.0–7.5
Adult male		8.0–8.5

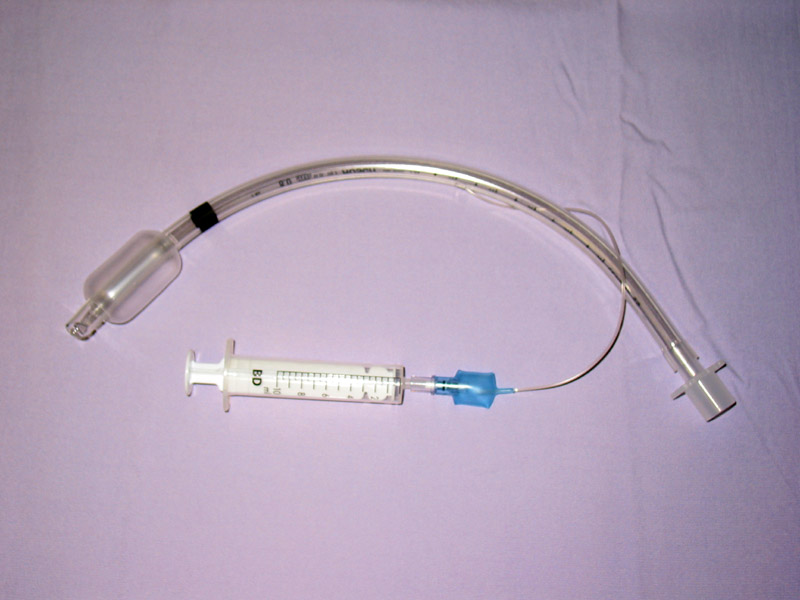
A typical cuffed endotracheal tube with already-inflated cuff and attached syringe. It is made of polyvinyl chloride (PVC)

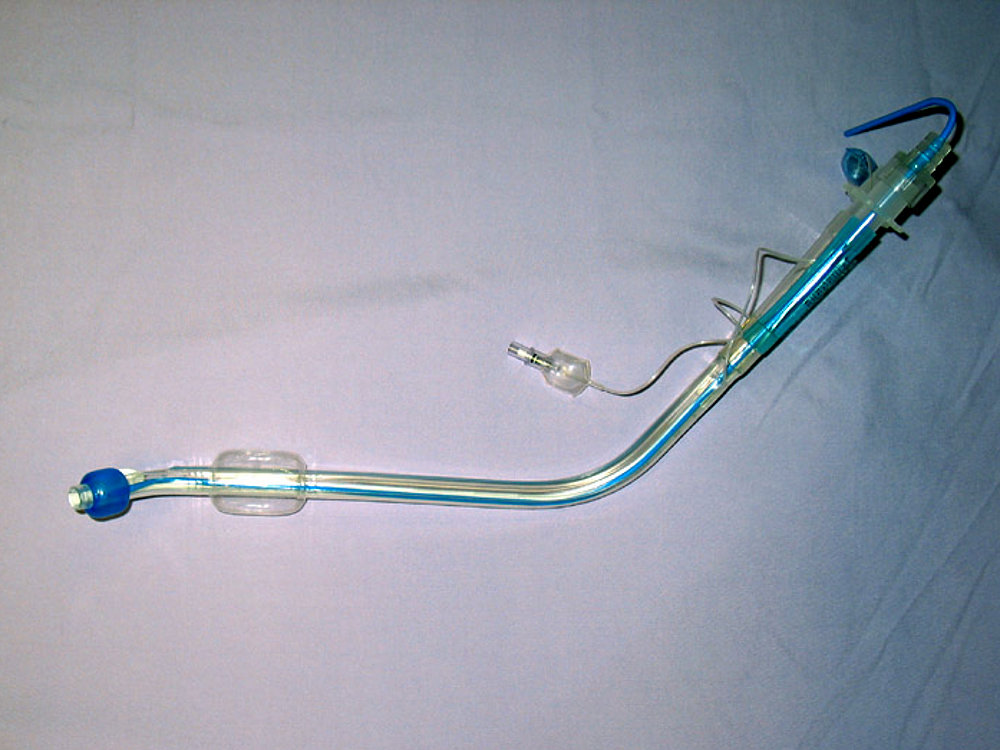
A Carlens double-lumen endotracheal tube, commonly used for thoracic surgical operations such as VATS lobectomy

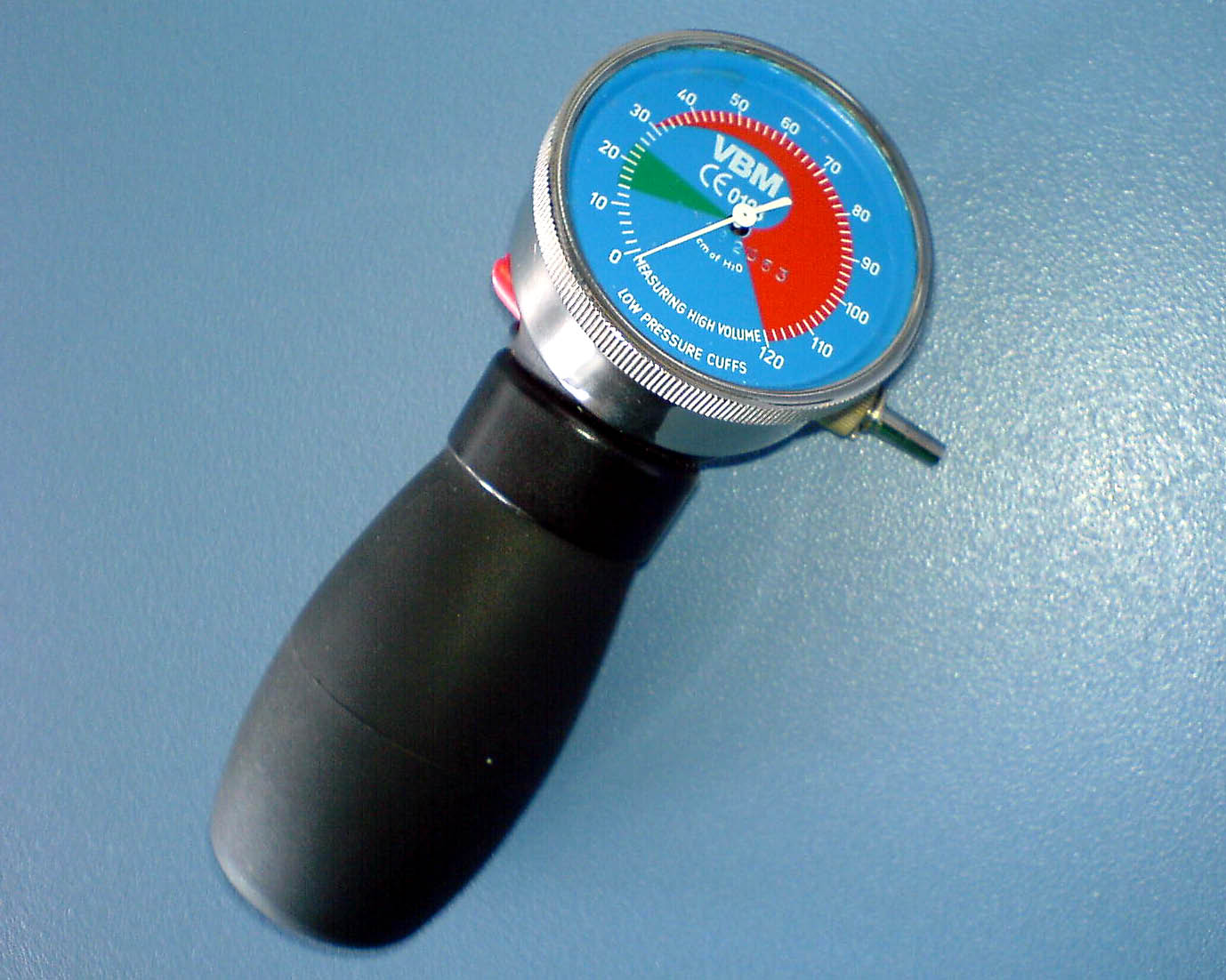
Cuff pressure gauge

Most endotracheal tubes today are constructed of polyvinyl chloride, but specialty tubes constructed of silicone rubber, latex rubber, or stainless steel are also widely available. Most tubes have an inflatable cuff to seal the trachea and bronchial tree against air leakage and aspiration of gastric contents, blood, secretions, and other fluids. Uncuffed tubes are also available, though their use is limited mostly to pediatric patients (in small children, the cricoid cartilage, the narrowest portion of the pediatric airway, often provides an adequate seal for mechanical ventilation).

Types of endotracheal tubes include oral or nasal, cuffed or uncuffed, preformed (e.g. RAE (Ring, Adair, and Elwyn) tube), reinforced tubes, and double-lumen endobronchial tubes. For human use, tubes range in size from 2 to 10.5 mm in internal diameter (ID). The size is chosen based on the patient's body size, with the smaller sizes being used for pediatric and neonatal patients. Tubes larger than 6 mm ID usually have an inflatable cuff. Originally made from red rubber, most modern tubes are made from polyvinyl chloride. Those placed in a laser field may be flexometallic. Robertshaw (and others) developed double-lumen endobronchial tubes for thoracic surgery. These allow single-lung ventilation while the other lung is collapsed to make surgery easier. The deflated lung is re-inflated as surgery finishes to check for fistulas (tears). Another type of endotracheal tube has a small second lumen opening above the inflatable cuff, which can be used for suction of the nasopharngeal area and above the cuff to aid extubation (removal). This allows suctioning of secretions that sit above the cuff which helps reduce the risk of chest infections in long-term intubated patients.

The "armored" endotracheal tubes are cuffed, wire-reinforced, silicone rubber tubes that are quite flexible but yet difficult to compress or kink. This can make them useful for situations in which the trachea is anticipated to remain intubated for a prolonged duration, or if the neck is to remain flexed during surgery. Polyvinyl chloride tubes are relatively stiff in comparison. Preformed tubes (such as the oral and nasal RAE tubes, named after the inventors Ring, Adair and Elwyn) are also widely available for special applications. These may also be constructed of polyvinyl chloride or wire-reinforced silicone rubber. Other tubes (such as the Bivona Fome-Cuf tube) are designed specifically for use in laser surgery in and around the airway. Various types of double-lumen endotracheal (actually, endobronchial) tubes have been developed (Carlens, White, Robertshaw, etc.) for ventilating each lung independently—this is useful during pulmonary and other thoracic operations.

== Tracheostomy tube ==
Several types of tracheostomy tubes are available, depending on the requirements of the patient, including Shiley, Bivona (a silicon tube with metal rings that are good for airways with damage to the tracheal rings or otherwise not straight), and fenestrated.

== Tracheal button ==
A tracheal button is generally used in people with severe obstructive sleep apnea, who often wear this device during waking hours and remove it while sleeping to ensure a patent airway and reduce the risk of asphyxiation. Since the tube does not extend far into the trachea, it is easy to breathe and speak with the device in place.

== See also ==
- Laryngeal tube
- Tracheal intubation
- Airway management
