= Act+Fast Anti Choking Trainer =

Choking rescue training vest

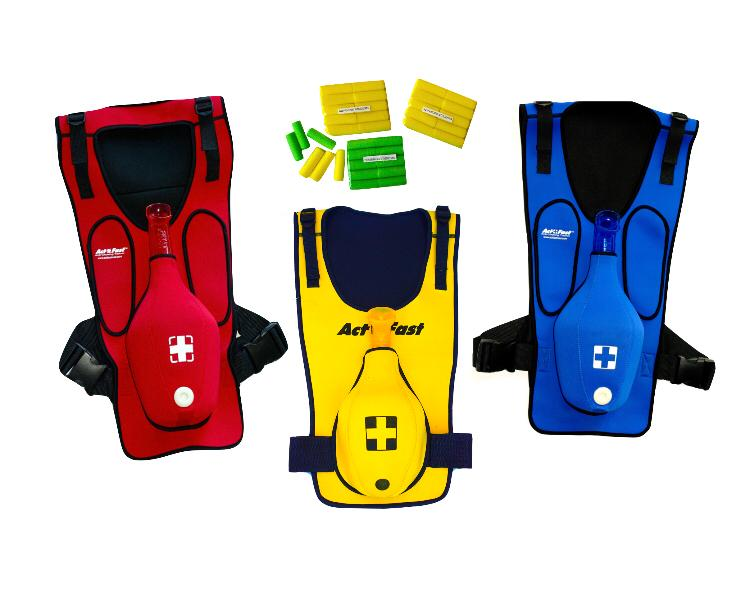
Act+Fast Anti Choking Trainers

The Act+Fast Anti Choking Trainer, also known as the “Choking Rescue Training Vest”, is a simulation device manufactured by Act+Fast LLC, a company based in California. It helps practice choking rescue techniques and is mainly used in basic airway management to teach choking rescue protocols, abdominal thrusts (Heimlich maneuver) and the back slap method. The Anti Choking Trainer was exhibited at the 2008 EMS Expo in Las Vegas, Nevada.

== Origin ==
The Act+Fast Anti Choking Trainer was first developed in 2008 by Dr. Timothy Adams after volunteering to help train Boy Scouts in the Heimlich maneuver using operating room supplies. It was subsequently implemented in CPR classes, hospitals, and schools.

== Operation ==
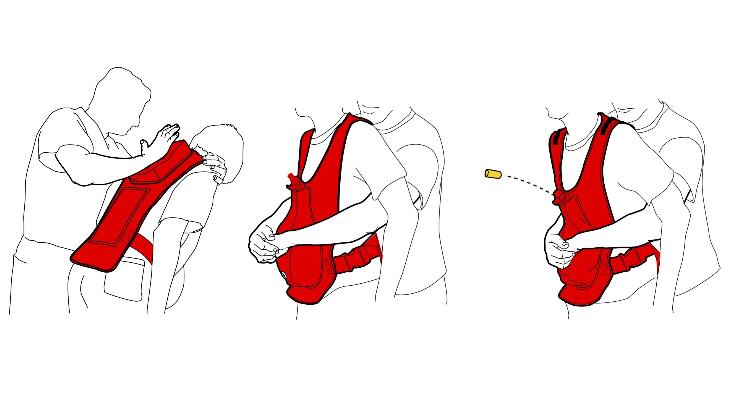
Act+Fast Anti Choking Trainer in action.

The Anti Choking Trainer is worn as a vest to simulate relief of an obstruction. The vest is slipped over the user’s head and secured with a buckle on each side. In front of the vest, is a neoprene pocket with a plastic air bladder that rests in the area between the user’s navel and rib cage. At the top of the bladder is a rigid airway with an opening that points upward and away from the user’s face. A foam plug is placed in the airway to simulate a foreign body airway obstruction (FBAO). When the proper technique is performed, the foam plug is launched into the air, providing immediate feedback. The Anti Choking Trainer also includes a foam back pad for backslaps. The Anti Choking Trainer allows users to practice the choking rescue protocols of the European Resuscitation Council, National Safety Council and International Red Cross and Red Crescent Movements around the world.

== Reception and recognition ==
The Anti Choking Trainer has been used by schools, fire departments, rescue groups and in CPR training classes.

In 2009 the Anti Choking trainer was named by the Journal of Emergency Medicine as one of 30 of the most innovative products at the 27th annual EMS Today.

== See also ==
- First-aid treatment of choking
- Basic airway management
- Choking Rescue Training Devices
- Abdominal thrusts
