= Douglas Chamberlain =

British cardiologist (1931–2025)

Professor Douglas Chamberlain CBE OStJ KSG
- Born: 4 April 1931; Cardiff, Wales
- Died: 22 May 2025 (aged 94)
- Education: Queens' College, Cambridge; Medical College of St Bartholomew's Hospital
- Occupation: Cardiologist
- Years active: 1956–2025
- Employer: Royal Sussex County Hospital (1970–2004)
- Known for: Cardiologist, expert in resuscitation and founder of paramedics in Europe

Douglas Anthony Chamberlain, CBE, OStJ, KSG (4 April 1931 – 22 May 2025) was a British cardiologist who founded the first paramedic unit in Europe, revolutionising pre-hospital clinical care.

== Early life ==
Chamberlain was born in Cardiff in 1931. His father was a coal merchant. He was not successful during his school years; he would frequently completely fail spelling and writing exercises. His parents sent him to board at Ratcliffe College, a private school near Leicester. There a school master realised he was very intelligent but had an 'inability to comprehend the written word'; a condition now called dyslexia. The extra help he was then given meant he passed the entrance exam to Queens' College, Cambridge, to study medicine.

Difficulty telling left and right, and a preference for rowing over the dissection room, almost caused him to fail on anatomy. A case of mistaken identity meant he passed; the external examiner wrongly thought he was the son of a famous physician and passed him. He graduated from the university in 1953 with a Bachelor of Arts (BA), that was later promoted to Master of Arts (MA). He then studied at Medical College of St Bartholomew's Hospital, qualifying as a doctor in 1956 as Bachelor of Medicine, Bachelor of Surgery (MB, BChir).

== Career ==
During his pre-registration year, 1957, Chamberlain remained at St Bartholomew's Hospital. He first undertook a nine-month appointment as house physician then three months as a house surgeon. His career direction in medicine rather than surgery was confirmed by a disastrous house surgeon rotation. He had been described by his surgical supervisor as the worst house surgeon he had ever encountered.

Chamberlain served as a Senior House Officer at Royal United Hospital (RUH) in Bath and then took a role as Resident Medical Officer at the country branch of the National Heart Hospital in Maids Moreton, Buckinghamshire while studying for the MRCP diploma.

He entered national service on 5 January 1959, commissioned into the Royal Army Medical Corps, British Army as a lieutenant (service number 459368) and was posted to the British Military Hospital (BMH) in Iserlohn. He was promoted to captain (acting Major) on 5 January 1960 and posted to BMH Hostert in Rheindahlen.

After a short spell working in chest medicine at the Brompton Hospital, Chamberlain returned to Cardiology at St Bartholomew's in January 1962 as a research Registrar and at the end of the tenure was promoted to Senior Registrar in December 1966. He served 2 years of the 4-year posting before taking a year's fellowship in Massachusetts General Hospital in 1968 working within the orbit of the Cardiac Catheterization Laboratory, a subdivision of the Department of Cardiology before returning for a final year at St Bartholomew's. Much of his research centred around the sympathetic nervous system, beta-blocking drugs, and pacing.

He worked at the Royal Sussex County Hospital between 1970 and 1991 as a Consultant Cardiologist, and as Honorary Consultant subsequently.

Chamberlain, together with Peter Baskett, trained ambulance personnel in resuscitation from late 1970. This was a pivotal moment in the development of the paramedic profession and Chamberlain and Baskett's work here and subsequently are acknowledged as the naissance of paramedics in Europe. Paramedics are now acknowledged as an autonomous and regulated profession and are still recognized for their abilities in cardiac care - as was first discovered by Chamberlain when teaching ECG recognition and cardiac care to nurses, doctors and ambulancemen from the 1970s to the mid-1990s in Brighton.

During this period, Chamberlain developed his "10 Rules of a normal ECG", a foundation for ECG interpretation used all over the world to this date.

Chamberlain maintained a major interest in resuscitation and prehospital care, and played a role in the development of the European Resuscitation Council and the International Liaison Committee on Resuscitation. Well into his 80s, Chamberlain was an Honorary Advisor to South East Coast Ambulance Service NHS Foundation Trust and London Ambulance Service NHS Trust and was 'available any time of the day or night to take calls from paramedics'.

He co-edited Cardiac Arrest: The Science and Practice of Resuscitation Medicine, a reference book on advanced life support and resuscitation medicine. It was winner of the 2008 British Medical Association prize in Cardiology. He was Editor Emeritus of Resuscitation, the official journal of the European Resuscitation Council, and was author or co-author of over 200 papers.

Chamberlain died on 22 May 2025, at the age of 94.

== Honours ==
In the 1988 New Year Honours, Chamberlain was appointed Commander of the Order of the British Empire (CBE). In June 1989, he was appointed Officer of the Order of St. John (OStJ). He was also a Knight of the Order of Saint Gregory the Great (KSG) and an Honorary Fellow of the College of Paramedics.

Chamberlain was made an honorary Doctor of Science (DSc) by the University of Sussex in 1989, Hertford in 2003, and Coventry University in 2008.
