= Chest compression =

Chest compression may refer to:

- The prevention of the expansion of the chest, see Compressive asphyxia
- A technique used during cardiopulmonary resuscitation or for the treatment of choking
