= Neonatal resuscitation =

Emergency medical procedure

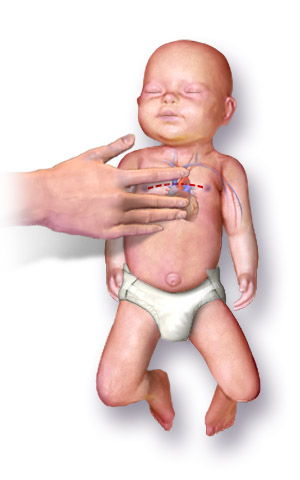
- Specialty: Neonatology
- Uses: Resuscitation of newborn infants after birth
- Frequency: 10% of newborns who do not readily begin breathing

Neonatal resuscitation, also known as newborn resuscitation, is an emergency procedure focused on supporting approximately 10% of newborn children who do not readily begin breathing, putting them at risk of irreversible organ injury and death. Many of the infants who require this support to start breathing well on their own after assistance. Through positive airway pressure, and in severe cases chest compressions, medical personnel certified in neonatal resuscitation can often stimulate neonates to begin breathing on their own, with attendant normalization of heart rate.

Face masks that cover the infant's mouth and nose are often used in the resuscitation procedures. Nasal prongs/tubes/masks and laryngeal mask airway devices are also sometimes used.

== Uses ==
Up to 10% of infants are born requiring assistance to begin breathing. After assistance, many of these infants begin to breathe on their own and are healthy. Breathing problems at birth is a high priority emergency and interventions such as breathing support and resuscitation is sometimes required.

All infants who are 'gasping', show signs of being apnoeic (suspension of breathing), or have bradycardia with a heart rate lower than 100 beats per minute after birth are recommended to be administered positive pressure ventilation with a 'manual ventilation device' to provide breathing support. Examples of manual ventilation devices include a self-inflating bag or a T-piece.

== Complications ==
About a quarter of all neonatal deaths globally are caused by birth asphyxia. This dangerous condition of oxygen deprivation may begin before birth. For example, if the umbilical cord, which supplies oxygen throughout fetal development, is compressed or tears during delivery. Depending on how quickly and successfully the infant is resuscitated, hypoxic damage can occur to most of the infant's organs (heart, lungs, liver, gut, kidneys). One serious complication is a brain injury known as neonatal hypoxic-ischemic encephalopathy.

== Training and certification ==
The most widely known training/certification for neonatal resuscitation is the Neonatal Resuscitation Program (NRP).

- Neonatal Resuscitation Program - Started by the American Academy of Pediatrics (AAP), this course has been revised several times and is currently offered to anyone who participates in neonatal resuscitation including but not limited to: Nurses, Physicians, Respiratory Therapists, Certified Nursing Assistants, and others. The course is broken down into 11 sections and a final skills assessment. There are currently 4 million healthcare providers that are certified. It is estimated that 200,000 healthcare providers take this course every year.
- Pediatric Advanced Life Support (PALS) - This program is more general to all pediatric patients, but does provide some neonatal resuscitation training.
- On-the-job training.

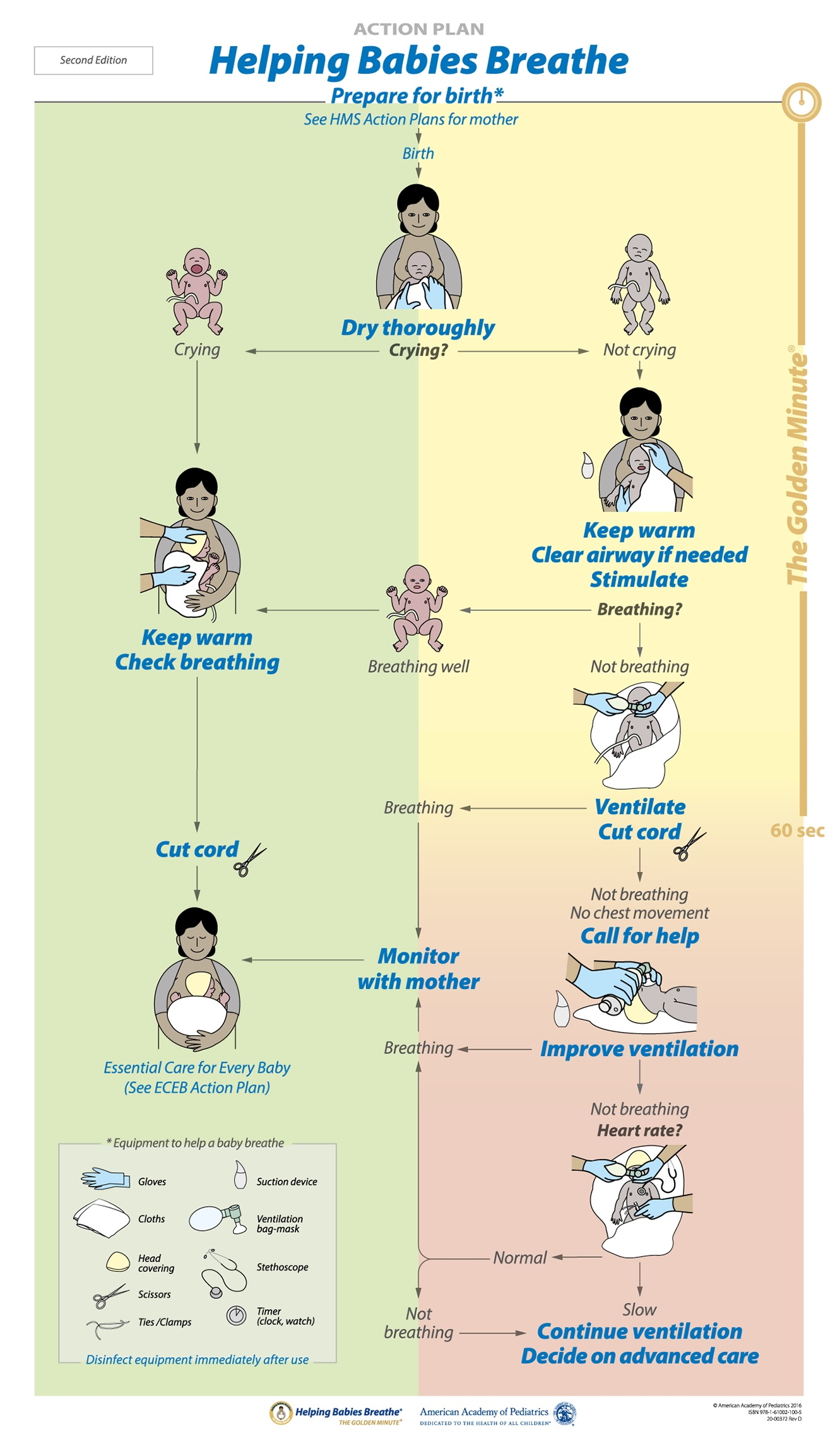
Helping Babies Breathe Action Plan, used to train birth attendants in neonatal resuscitation in low-resource settings.

Helping Babies Breathe (HBB) is a neonatal resuscitation training program developed by the AAP and partners for birth attendants in resource-limited settings. The program emphasizes initial assessment, stimulation, and bag-mask ventilation within the first minute after birth. The second edition of HBB was updated to align with ILCOR and World Health Organization (WHO) recommendations for basic newborn resuscitation.

== Resuscitation guidelines ==
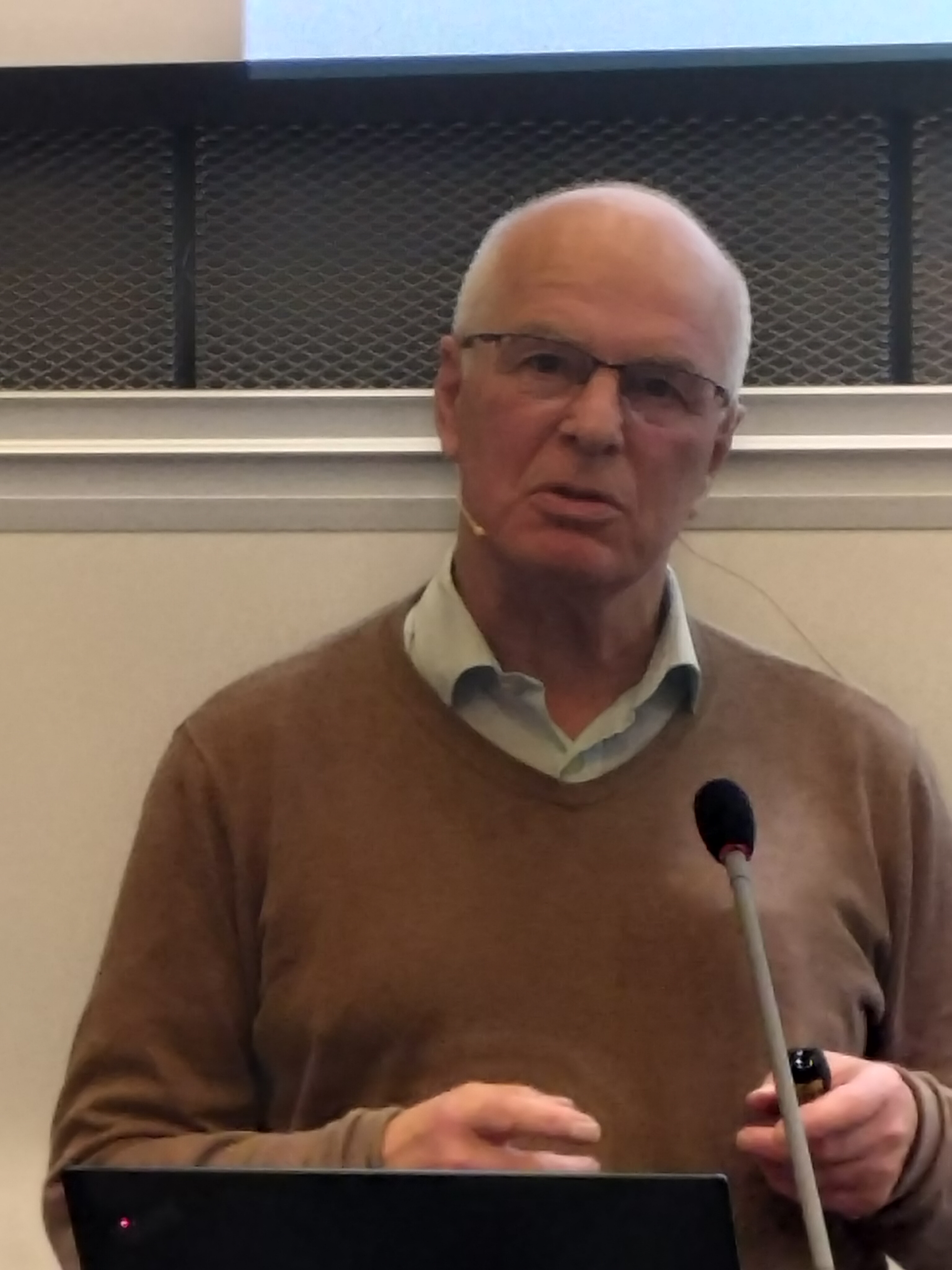
Ola Didrik Saugstad i 2025: an advocate of using normal air

The International Liaison Committee on Resuscitation (ILCOR) has published Consensus on science and treatment recommendations for neonatal resuscitation. Traditionally, newborn children have been resuscitated using mechanical ventilation with 100% oxygen, but there has since the 1980s increasingly been debated whether newborn infants with asphyxia should be resuscitated with 100% oxygen or normal air, and notably Ola Didrik Saugstad has been a major advocate of using normal air.

In 2020, the International Liaison Committee on Resuscitation (ILCOR) published its 4th and most recent recommendations for newborn life support. The committee reviewed 8 major topics, including anticipation and preparation, initial assessment and intervention, physiologic monitoring and feedback devices, ventilation and oxygenation, circulatory support, drug and fluid administration, prognostication during CPR, and post-resuscitation care.

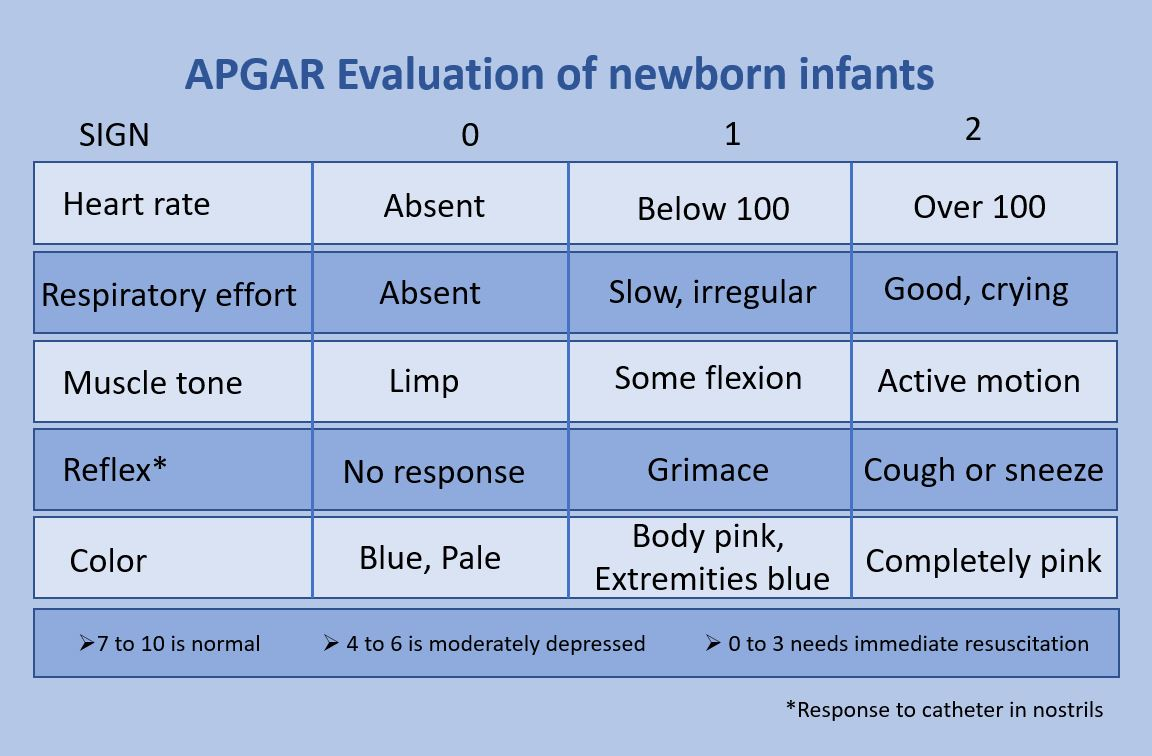
Apgar score for newborn infants

Initial evaluation of a newborn is done by obtaining an Apgar score, which gives the clinician an approximation of the infant's cardiovascular and neurologic condition at birth. A score of 7–10 at 5 minutes is normal, a score of 4 to 6 at 5 minutes is intermediate, and a score of 0-3 is considered low. It is important to understand that an Apgar score is not a diagnosis, it is merely a clinical finding. If a newborn's score is 0–3, then resuscitation efforts are initiated.

Neonatal resuscitation guidelines closely resemble those of the pediatric basic and advanced life support. The main differences in training include an emphasis on positive pressure ventilation (PPV), updated timings on ventilation assistance rates, and some differences in the cardiac arrest chain of survival. Guidelines for neonatal resuscitation are assessed annually and are developed in collaboration with multiple organizations of numerous experts, including the American Academy of Pediatrics (AAP).

In 2020, the ILCOR recommended the following changes to current resuscitation guidelines:

- Ceasing oropharyngeal and nasopharyngeal suctioning for newborns with clear or meconium-stained amniotic fluid.
- Newborns who receive Positive Pressure Ventilation (PPV) for either ineffective respirations or bradycardia should not also receive initially sustained inflations greater than 5 seconds.
- Intravenous epinephrine is administered if the heart rate does not increase to 60 beats per minute after ventilation and chest compressions have been optimized.
- umbilical venous catheterization should be the primary vascular access route during delivery.

While some guidelines do tend to change, certain elements of neonatal resuscitation have persisted. These include:

- For uncomplicated term or preterm infants, delayed cord clamping is standard so that the child can immediately be placed in the mothers arms to be evaluated.
- Supplemental oxygen is used judiciously.
- Monitoring of heart rate is the best indicator of response to resuscitation efforts.
- Epinephrine should be administered intravenously if response to chest compressions is poor.

== Outcomes ==
Most neonatal deaths (roughly 75%) after resuscitation occur within the first week, but the vast majority occur within 24 hours. This statistic is based on a mean Apgar score of 5.9, which is considered intermediate. More data is needed to understand outcomes for more severe patients. Outcomes after resuscitation for neonates vary widely based on many factors. One study in Norway analyzed 15 peer-reviewed published articles and found that high-income countries have a mortality rate as high as 10% while low-income countries have a mortality rate as high as 28%. One major factor that improved survival was how quickly medical responders were able to intervene, noting that the first minutes are critical.

It has been demonstrated that high concentrations of oxygen lead to generation of oxygen free radicals, which have a role in reperfusion injury after asphyxia. Clinical trial evidence suggests that resuscitation using air probably reduces the risk of death and the 2010 ILCOR guidelines recommend the use of normal air rather than 100% oxygen. Another study showed that preterm infants have little or no difference in risk of death or neurodevelopment disability when higher concentrations of oxygen are used compared to lower concentrations but the evidence from clinical trials is still relatively uncertain.

Currently, it is the gold standard to place neonates on a cooling blanket for 72 hours to achieve total body cooling. This is done in order to minimize brain swelling. After cooling is achieved, an MRI is obtained roughly 1 week after hypoxic brain injury in order to classify the severity of brain damage. However, one study found that there was no significant correlation between MRI findings and developmental delay up to 2 years of life.
