= Pediatric intensive care unit =

Hospital unit for critically ill children

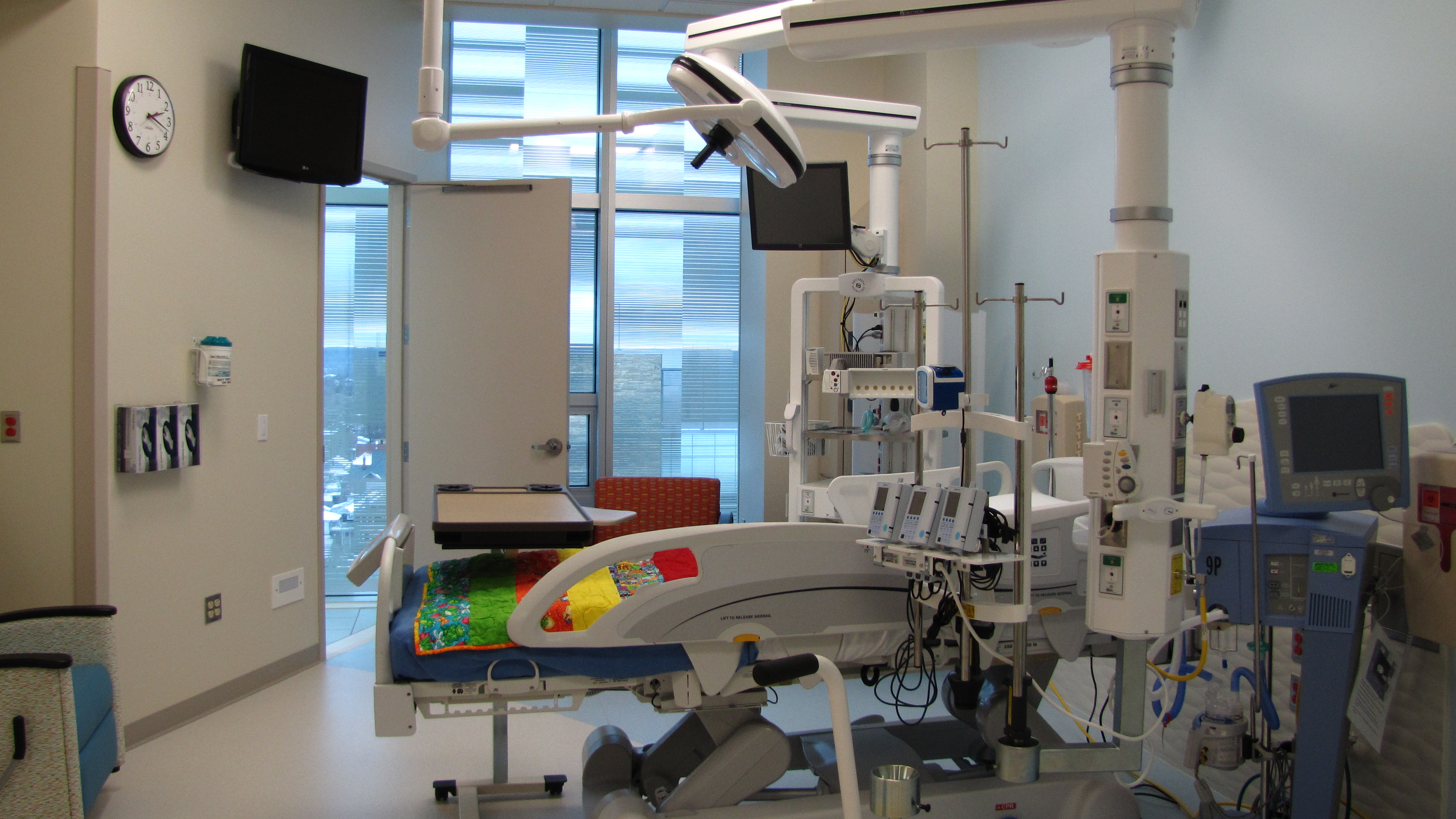
- A pediatric intensive care unit at Helen DeVos Children's Hospital in Michigan.
- Other names: PICU
- Specialty: Pediatric
- Uses: Area within a hospital specializing in the care of critically ill infants, children, and teenagers

A pediatric intensive care unit (also paediatric), usually abbreviated to PICU (/ˈpɪkjuː/), is an area within a hospital specializing in the care of critically ill infants, children, teenagers, and young adults aged 0–21. A PICU is typically directed by one or more pediatric intensivists or PICU consultants and staffed by doctors, nurses, and respiratory therapists who are specially trained and experienced in pediatric intensive care. The unit may also have nurse practitioners, physician assistants, physiotherapists, social workers, child life specialists, and clerks on staff, although this varies widely depending on geographic location. The ratio of professionals to patients is generally higher than in other areas of the hospital, reflecting the acuity of PICU patients and the risk of life-threatening complications. Complex technology and equipment is often in use, particularly mechanical ventilators and patient monitoring systems. Consequently, PICUs have a larger operating budget than many other departments within the hospital.

== History ==
Goran Haglund is credited with establishing the very first pediatric ICU in 1955; this PICU was located at Children's Hospital of Goteburg in Sweden. The first PICU in the United States is a topic often debated. Currently, Fuhrman's Textbook in Pediatric Critical Care lists Pediatric Critical Care Unit at the Children's Hospital of District of Columbia in Washington, DC, dating back to 1965, as the first pediatric critical care unit in the U.S.A. Medical Director was Dr. Berlin. As soon as 1966, another well-documented early pediatric intensive care unit opened at Kings County Hospital in Brooklyn, NY. It was caring for patients with open heart surgery and peritoneal dialysis under the helm of Dr. Rodriguez-Torres. The PICU most commonly referred to as first is the Children's Hospital of Philadelphia in 1967 by John Downes. The PICU at Lurie Children's Hospital was also established in 1967, the same year as the unit at the Children's Hospital of Philadelphia. The establishment of these early units eventually led to hundreds of PICUs being developed across North America and Europe.

There were a variety of factors that led to the development of PICUs. John Downes identified five specialties of medicine that aided in the development. These specialties included adult respiratory ICUs, neonatal intensive care, pediatric general surgery, pediatric cardiac surgery, and pediatric anesthesiology.

Between 1930 and 1950 the poliomyelitis epidemic had created a greater need for adult respiratory intensive care, including the iron lung. There were times when children would contract polio and would have to be treated in these ICUs as well. This contributed to the need for a unit where critically ill children could be treated. Respiratory issues were also increasing in children because neonatal intensive care units were increasing the survival rates of infants. This was due to advances in mechanical ventilation. However, this resulted in children developing chronic lung diseases, but there was not a specific unit to treat these diseases.

Advancements in pediatric general surgery, cardiac surgery, and anesthesiology were also a driving factor in the development of the PICU. The surgeries that were being performed were becoming more complicated and required more extensive postoperative monitoring. This monitoring could not be performed on the regular pediatric unit, which led to Children's Hospital of Philadelphia's development of the first American PICU. Advancements in pediatric anesthesiology resulted in anesthesiologist treating pediatric patients outside of the operating room. This caused pediatricians to obtain skills in anesthesiology in order to make them more capable of treating critically ill pediatric patients. These pediatric anesthesiologists eventually went on to develop run PICUs.

In the 2000s, the live discharging rate of child and adolescent patients in the US and in the UK become higher than 96%. As of 2003, in the same countries more than 250.000 children were introduced to PICU (pediatric intensive care unit).

With the growth of hospitals with PICUs in the 1980s, the American Academy of Pediatrics (AAP) and the pediatric section of the Society of Critical Care Medicine (SCCM) set forth guidelines in 1993 for PICUs. Since the establishment of those guidelines, both the number of PICUs and number of PICU beds has been steadily increasing in the US. This growth could be attributed to the advancement of medical care and the increased survival of children with chronic illnesses with the need for higher level of support. With this increase, there has been variability in the distribution across the US, mainly in areas with larger, specialized centers. Additionally, there was an expansion of specialized PICUs, for example cardiac, trauma and neuroscience PICUs, seen in this time frame.

There was a significant shortage of pediatric ICUs in the United States during the 2022–2023 pediatric care crisis.

== Characteristics ==
There are a variety of PICU characteristics that allow the healthcare providers to deliver the most optimal care possible. The first of these characteristics is the physical environment of the PICU. The layout of the unit should allow the staff to constantly observe the patients they are caring for. The staff should also be able to rapidly respond to the patients if there is any change in the patient's clinical status.

Correct staffing is the next vital component to a successful PICU. The nursing staff is highly experienced in providing care to the most critical patients. The nurse to patient ratio should remain low, meaning that the nurses should only be caring for 1-2 patients depending on the clinical status of the patients. If the patient's clinical status is critical, then they will require more monitoring and interventions than a patient that is stable.

In most cases, the nurses and physicians are caring for the same patients for a long period of time. This allows the providers to build rapport with the patients, so that all of the patient's needs are fulfilled. The nurses and physicians must work together as a collaborative team to provide optimal care. The successful collaboration between nurses and physician has resulted in lower mortality rates not just in PICUs, but all intensive care units.

Care team staff in addition to physicians, sub-specialists, and nurses include but are not limited to physician assistants, nurse practitioners, respiratory therapists, pharmacists, physical therapists, occupational therapists, speech therapists, nutritionists, dietitians, social workers, clergy, child life specialists, palliative care, rapid response team, transport team, ethics committee, and medical students.

== Levels of care ==
Since the 1993 AAP and SCCM guidelines were developed, and as medicine has matured over time, the development of the pediatrics intensive care unit has expanded to maintain a level I and a level II PICU. These levels are defined by the resources available and the range of medical conditions treated. These guidelines have been revised and updated in both 2004 and 2019 as medical care advances and facilities grow.

A level I PICU is defined as a PICU that cares for the most critically ill child. Health care team members must be capable of providing a wide variety of care that typically involves intensive, rapidly changing, and progressive approach. This includes a medical director that is board-certified in critical care medicine, a full range of sub-specialists that are available within 1 hour, hemodialysis capabilities, a transport team and system, dedicated PICU respiratory therapists, dedicated PICU nurses, capabilities for resuscitation in the emergency department, and dedicated physicians covering in the PICU for all 24 hours per day.

A level II PICU does not meet the criteria for level I. Typically, patients will present with less complex acuity and will be more stable. Level II units have well-established relationships with level I units that allow for timely transport for higher level of care as needed.

Given the growth of pediatric critical care and improvements in general PICUs, there has been a growth in specialized PICUs like cardiovascular medicine, transplant, neurology, trauma, and oncology. New recommendations for classification of units based on level of care are community-based PICU, tertiary PICU, and quaternary or specialized PICU.

=== 2019 AAP Guidance and Recommendations ===
Community-based PICUs were previously known as level II units and provide a broad range of services.

Tertiary PICUs were previously known as level I units and provide advanced care.

Quaternary or specialized PICUs serve large catchment areas and provide comprehensive care for complex patients.

== Common conditions ==
Common reasons for admission to the PICU include:

- Respiratory failure needing additional support or mechanical ventilation
- Acute respiratory distress syndrome (ARDS)
- Severe asthma exacerbation
- Apnea
- Sepsis
- Shock
- Trauma (including non-accidental trauma)
- Altered mental status
- Congenital heart defects
- Diabetic ketoacidosis complications
- Gastrointestinal perforations
- Cancer / chemotherapy
- Organ transplants
- Prolonged seizures
- Poisoning
- Other life-threatening conditions

== Certifications ==
=== Nursing skills ===
As a PICU nurse, extended knowledge and certifications may be required. Recognition and interpretation are two of the many required skills for a PICU nurse. This allows nurses to be able to detect any changes in the patient's condition and to respond accordingly. Other skills may include route of administration, resuscitation, respiratory and cardiac interventions, preparation and maintenance of patient monitors, and psycho-social skills to ensure comfort of patient and family.

There are a variety of certificates that are required for registered nurses to acquire in order to work in the PICU. One of these certifications is the Critical Care Registered Nurse (pediatric) certificate. This certificate allows nurses to care for critically ill pediatric patients in any setting, not just the PICU. Other certificates include cardiopulmonary resuscitation, pediatric basic life support, and pediatric advance life support.

=== Physician ===
In the US, a pediatric intensivist is board certified and trained in a 3-year pediatric critical care fellowship.

== Factors leading to poor outcomes ==
The patients in the PICU are the most critically ill children in the hospital setting. There are times where these children do not have the best outcomes, which may result in permanent deficits or even death. There are times where nothing more could have been done to improve the outcome for these patients. However, there are times where care could have differed and the result may have been better.

There are a variety of factors that have led to poor outcomes in PICU patients. The main factor that leads to inadequate care for PICU patients is improper health assessment by the healthcare providers. This may include not observing a change in the patient's clinical status, delayed resuscitation efforts, delayed decision making, or a combination of any of these factors. If any of these factors do occur, it may result in permanent deficits in the most critical patients.

Measures may be taken to prevent improper assessments from occurring. Proper education on how to conduct a proper assessment and how to recognize a critically ill pediatric patient can improve patient outcomes. This includes being able to recognize signs of deteriorating clinical status and perform proper triage of patients. This education is not only for the PICU staff, but also for emergency medical services, the emergency department staff, and staff of the pediatric unit.

Working in the PICU result may in emotional stress and/or occupational burnout of the staff. For patients that do get discharged from the unit, often they are not free of chronic conditions or disabilities. There are other factors that lead to stressful work conditions for the staff of the PICU. The staff often work for long periods of time in order to stabilize the most critically ill pediatric patients. They must collaborate with other members the healthcare team in order to develop the best plan of care. Once a plan of care is developed, then the staff must communicate the plan with the patient's family in order to see if it matches their beliefs. If the plan of care does not match the family's beliefs, then it must be modified the plan causing more stress on the staff. All of this causes the staff a great deal of stress and each member of the unit must develop their own coping mechanisms in order to prevent burnout.

== See also ==
- Intensive care unit
- Intensive care medicine
- Neonatal intensive care unit
- Pediatrics
- Prism score of pediatric mortality
