= Choking rescue training devices =

Medical simulation equipment

Choking rescue training devices are choking simulation equipment used by first aid learners to prepare for dealing with real world choking scenarios. They have been approved and used by the European Resuscitation Council, St John Ambulance, and International Red Cross and Red Crescent Movement. The simulation devices are used to demonstrate choking rescue techniques such as abdominal thrusts and backslap method and practice choking rescue protocols by American Heart Association and Red Cross.

== Devices ==
=== Anti-choking training vests ===
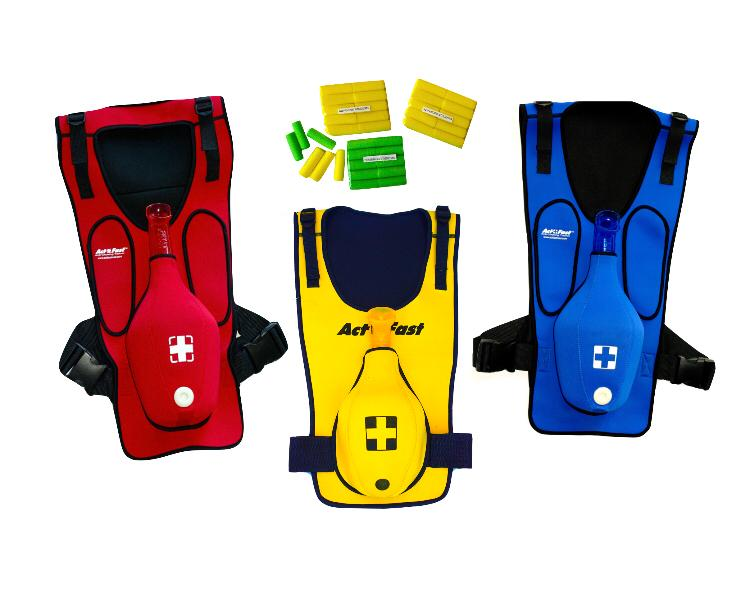
Act+Fast AntiChoking Trainers

The Anti-Choking Trainer, developed by Act+Fast, LLC, is a light-weight neoprene vest that users wear to practice the abdominal thrust maneuver and backslap method. There are two protocol models available: Act+Fast Red with a Back Slap Pad for the Red Cross Choking Rescue Protocol and Act+Fast Blue for the American Heart Association Protocol.

=== Choking manikins ===
==== Choking Charlie ====
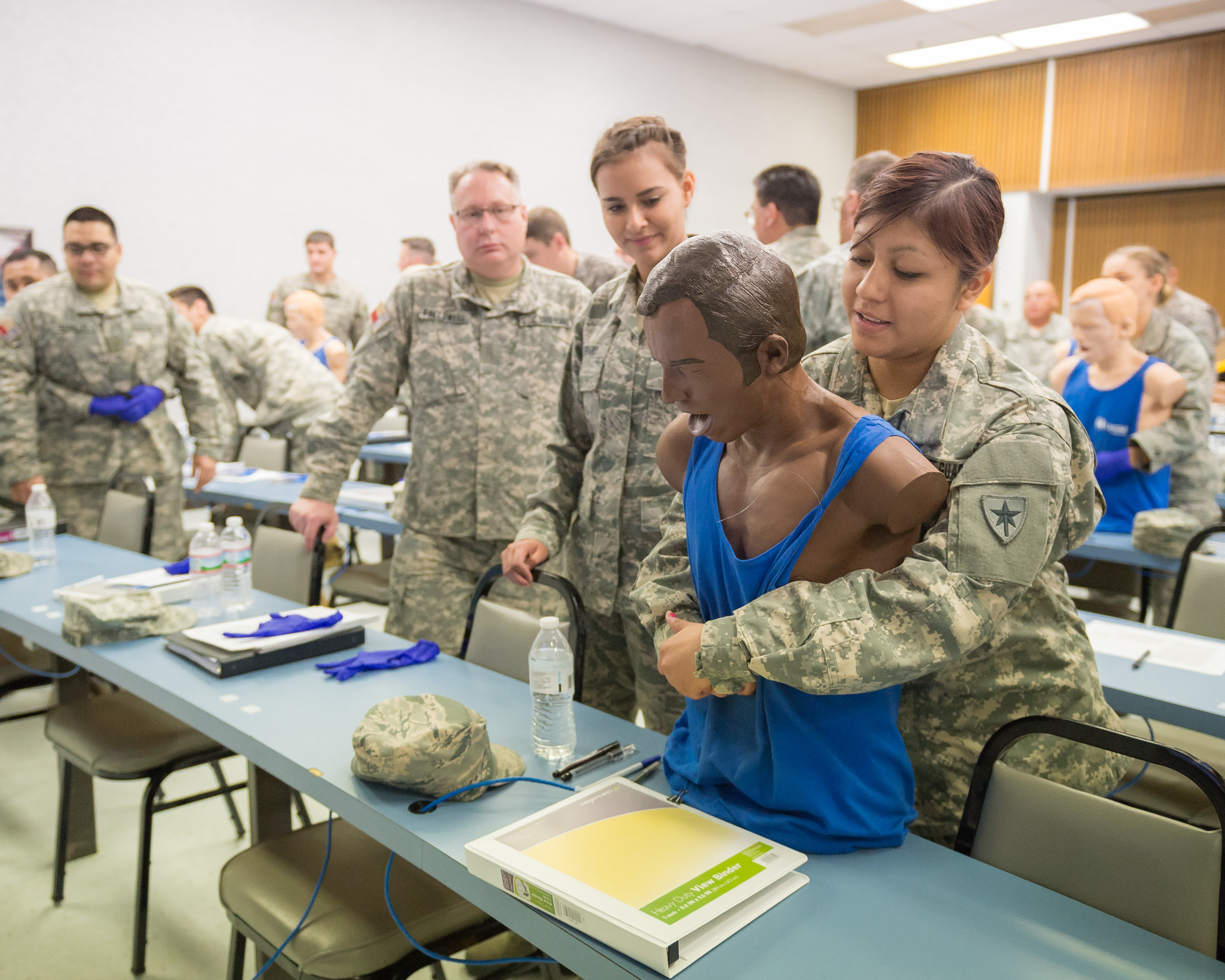
A Texas State Guard practicing Heimlich Maneuver on Choking Charlie

The Choking Charlie manikin, developed by Laerdal Medical, is an adult torso specifically designed for training students in the performance of the Heimlich Maneuver and backslap method. Cast by a human specimen, Choking Charlie's realistic anatomy and response-using simulated boluses provide instructors with a tool for instructing and practicing the anti-choking techniques.

==== Simulaids ====
Simulaids choking manikins are life-sized and are designed for choking training in specific individuals. The manikins are in infant, child and adult sizes and are also modelled in different body types such as obese choking manikin. The manikins are designed anatomically accurate internally as well allowing for choking boluses to be inserted for providing visual feedback upon performing anti-choking techniques.

== Operations ==
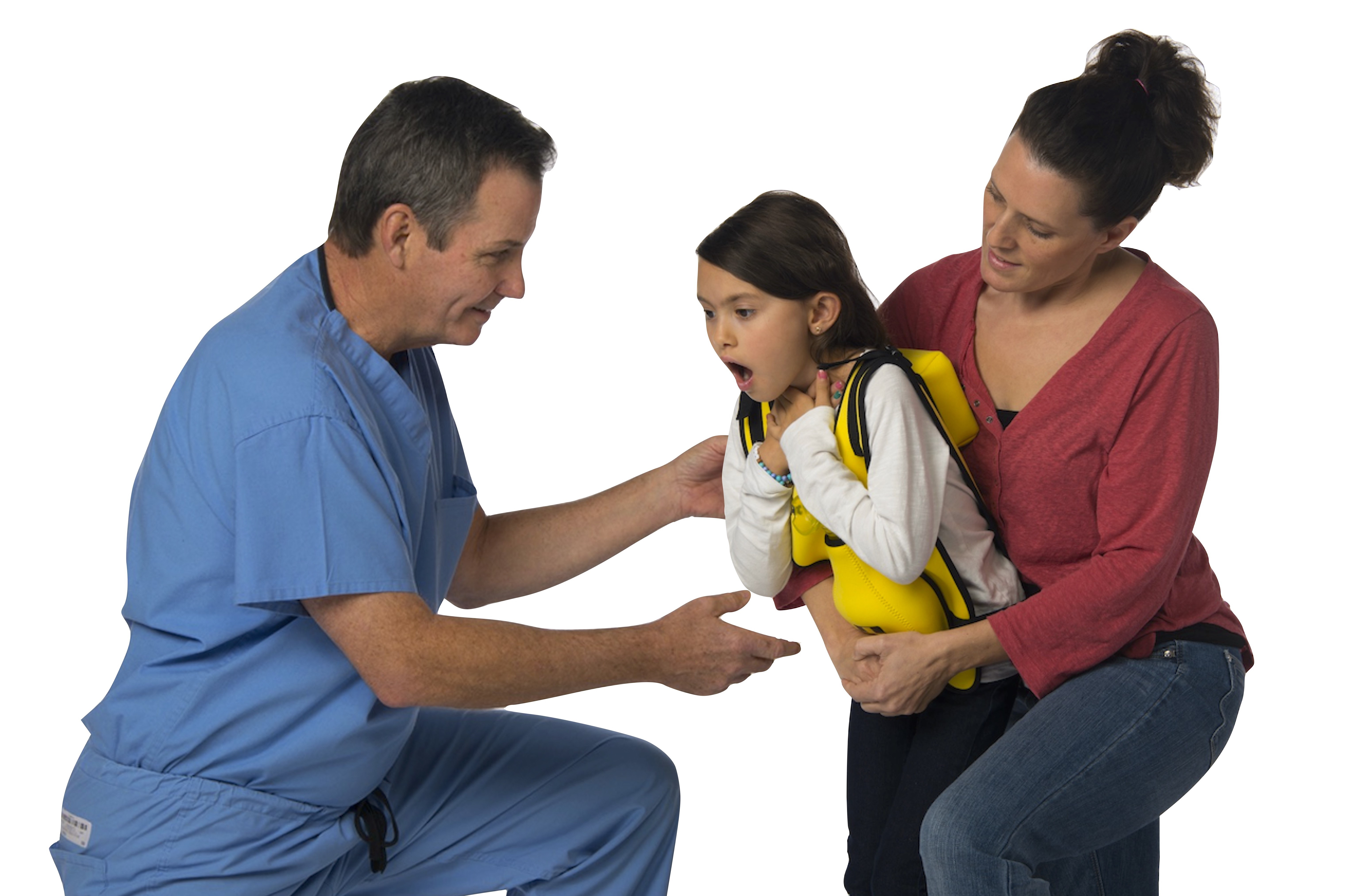
Anti Choking Trainer in use

The simulation device is designed so when the trainee does the Heimlich maneuver correctly a foam plug, simulating a foreign body airway obstruction (FBAO), is launched in the air.

The manikins are used for practicing the abdominal thrust maneuver, the back slap method and CPR. When the abdominal thrusts are performed correctly, the object simulating the FBAO is expelled from the manikin's airway. The manikins have anatomical landmarks including a ribcage, jugular notch, and xiphoid process to provide anatomical reference points for demonstrations.

== Reception and real world use ==
Choking rescue training devices have been used in first aid training in schools, rescue groups and fire departments.

The use of the devices in first aid training has been attributed to help save individuals choking in real world scenarios.
