= Delayed cord clamping (DCC) =

Delayed cord clamping (DCC) is the practice of postponing the clamping and cutting of the umbilical cord after birth, allowing continued blood flow between the placenta and the newborn. It is an alternative to immediate cord clamping, in which the cord is clamped within seconds after delivery.

Delayed cord clamping is commonly defined as clamping the umbilical cord 30 seconds or more after birth, although the exact timing varies across clinical guidelines and practice.

Some practitioners advocate waiting until the cessation of umbilical cord pulsation. Obstetric guidelines recommend delayed umbilical cord clamping for at least 30–60 seconds after birth, including during caesarean section, provided that both the mother and the newborn are clinically stable.

== Physiology ==
During late pregnancy, approximately 450 ml of blood per minute circulates through the placenta. At birth, the umbilical cord contains an estimated 60–80 ml of blood, which may constitute up to 20% of additional blood volume if transferred to the newborn.

Delayed cord clamping facilitates placental transfusion, the transfer of residual blood from the placenta and umbilical cord to the newborn. Most of this transfer occurs within the first minute after birth. This mechanism is facilitated when newborns start breathing and their lungs expand, creating negative pressure, as well as by contraction of the uterus.

== Clinical effects ==
Delayed cord clamping may not be feasible in all deliveries, particularly in cases requiring immediate neonatal resuscitation or urgent obstetric intervention. Additionally, the volume of placental transfusion varies and cannot be predicted for individual births.

In term infants, delayed cord clamping has been associated with increased hemoglobin levels and iron stores, which may persist for up to six months after birth; however, it may also be associated with potential adverse effects, such as an increased risk of jaundice requiring phototherapy.

In preterm infants, DCC has been associated with improved circulatory stability and a reduction in complications related to prematurity.

== Clinical practice guidelines ==
Recommendations regarding delayed cord clamping vary among professional organizations and standards of prenatal care. In 2018, the American College of Obstetricians and Gynecologists (ACOG) recommended delaying cord clamping for 30–60 seconds in both term and preterm infants.

The Royal College of Obstetricians and Gynaecologists (RCOG) states that cord clamping should not be performed earlier than necessary and should be guided by clinical assessment.

The World Health Organization (WHO) recommends delaying cord clamping for at least 60 seconds for all births.

Clinical practice varies, with some practitioners favoring longer delays and others adhering to shorter intervals. The timing of DCC is difficult to define because it should be based on the newborn's physiology, especially the ability to breathe. For stable neonates and mothers, obstetric guidelines recommend delayed umbilical cord clamping for at least 30 to 60 seconds post-delivery, including during caesarean section. Surgical closure of the maternal incision should not interfere with this recommended practice whenever possible.

== Controversy ==
Delayed cord clamping is associated with side effects that include prolonged jaundice requiring phototherapy and polycythemia (an excess of blood cells in the circulation). It remains a subject of debate, particularly regarding optimal timing. Differences in clinical recommendations reflect variations in the interpretation of available evidence and practical considerations in delivery settings.

== Interaction with cord blood banking ==
Delayed cord clamping does not preclude umbilical cord blood collection, although it is associated with a reduction in the volume and cell counts of collected blood. Cord blood banking involves the collection of blood from the umbilical cord after delivery for potential therapeutic use. It can be either for donation for unrelated uses (public banking) or donation for family use (family banking). Delayed cord clamping beyond 1 minute may negatively affect the collection of cord blood for public banking, as strict minimum volume requirements can limit the number of eligible donations. A delay of approximately 30 to 60 seconds is frequently considered sufficient to allow partial placental transfusion while maintaining the possibility of cord blood collection. Timing of cord clamping does not affect the chances of collecting other perinatal tissues (such as cord tissue or placenta), which are frequently banked along with cord blood. The amount of cord blood available for banking varies depending on factors such as umbilical cord length, placental size, and individual physiological differences.

== Clinical practice ==
The timing of cord clamping is typically determined on a case-by-case basis and may be included in a birth plan developed in consultation with healthcare providers. Considerations include maternal and fetal health, risk of prematurity, and the potential use of cord blood for medical purposes.
