= Prism score of pediatric mortality =

Pediatric Risk of Mortality
- Synonyms: PRISM
- Purpose: variables required for pediatric intensive-care unit (PICU) mortality risk assessment

The Pediatric Risk of Mortality (PRISM) score was developed from the Physiologic Stability Index (PSI) to reduce the number of physiologic variables required for pediatric intensive-care unit (PICU) mortality risk assessment, from 34 (in the PSI) to 14, and to obtain an objective weighting of the remaining variables.

PRISM III, an updated version of the scoring system published in 1996, has several improvements over the original PRISM. However, it is only available under licence and is not widely used outside of the United States.

PRISM III score has 17 physiologic variables subdivided into 26 ranges. The variables most predictive of mortality were minimum systolic blood pressure, abnormal pupillary reflexes, and stupor/coma.
