= Neonatal Resuscitation Program =

US educational program

Neonatal Resuscitation Program logo

The Neonatal Resuscitation Program is an educational program in neonatal resuscitation that was developed and is maintained by the American Academy of Pediatrics. This program focuses on basic resuscitation skills for newly born infants.

With the rollout of the seventh edition of the Neonatal Resuscitation Program to reflect the 2016 American Academy of Pediatrics guidelines for resuscitation, the course format has changed considerably. In the past, a full-day course incorporated lecture, written testing and hands-the classroom time required for the course and allows instructors to focus on the practical skills needed to resuscitate the neonate. The program is intended for healthcare providers who perform resuscitation in the delivery room or newborn nursery. Providers who take the Neonatal Resuscitation Program are diverse in their scope of practice. The course outline is flexible to allow providers to complete specific modules directly related to their practice.

== Lesson modules ==
1. Overview and principles of resuscitation
2. Initial steps in resuscitation
3. Use of resuscitation devices for positive-pressure ventilation
4. Chest compressions
5. Tracheal intubation
6. Medication
7. Special considerations
8. Resuscitation of babies born pre-term
9. Ethics and care at the end of life
