= Peter Baskett =

Northern Irish physician

Peter Baskett MB BCh BAO, FRCA, FRCP, FFAEM, Dip IMC RCS (Ed)
- Born: 26 July 1934; Belfast
- Died: 18 April 2008 (aged 73)
- Education: Queen's University Belfast; Queens' College, Cambridge
- Occupation: Consultant anaesthetist
- Years active: 1958 - 2007
- Organization(s): President of the Association of Anaesthetists of Great Britain and Ireland (1990 - 92)
- Known for: Founder of paramedics in the UK and Europe, introduced Entonox into the ambulance service, and creator of the European Life Support (ALS) course
- Spouse: Fiona M Baskett
- Children: 4
- Father: Sir Ronald Gilbert Baskett

Peter John Firth Baskett (26 July 1934 – 18 April 2008) was a Northern Irish physician, specializing in anaesthesia. He was responsible for the introduction of paramedics into the United Kingdom, created specialist ambulances for delivering on-scene pain relief to patients, and was the first chairman of the European Resuscitation Council.

== Early life ==
Baskett was born in Northern Ireland on 26 July 1934. His father, Sir Ronald Gilbert Baskett, was professor and Dean of the Faculty of Agriculture at Queen's University, Belfast and Peter was brought up on a 1000 acre research farm in Hillsborough, County Down. He attended Belfast Royal Academy and Campbell College, Belfast. He then studied medicine at Queens' College, Cambridge, for his pre-clinical studies, then finished his degree at Queen's University, Belfast, where he graduated with MB BCh BAO in 1958.

== Career ==
Baskett worked at Royal Victoria Hospital, Belfast in Accident and Emergency medicine but then took on the role of a lecturer in physiology. He also worked as a locum in general practice both in rural practices as well as in Belfast. He then began to explore the possibility of specialising in anaesthesia. He had watched anaesthetists at work and had administered the mandatory anaesthetics as a medical student. He Professor John Dundee who appointed him to a post in his department. Baskett then travelled to London for a surgical primary fellowship, but instead he sat the anaesthetic primary fellowship and went on to acquire the fellowship of the Faculty of Anaesthetists of the Royal College of Surgeons (FFARCS) in 1963.

His interests led him, in 1962, to Bristol where he was appointed registrar. In 1964, he became a senior registrar and in 1966 he was appointed consultant anaesthetist to the Bristol group of hospitals. He and his friend and colleague (John Zorab) devised a "primary FFA course" calling on the teaching skills of many of the consultants in the Bristol area. Several years later this gave rise to a joint course with the College of Medicine in the University of Wales in Cardiff and, later still to a final FFA course.

Baskett had a great interest in the innovative use of Entonox (premixed nitrous oxide and oxygen) in pain relief. Baskett's most important contribution to healthcare was the provision of prehospital care by specially trained ambulance personnel. nurses and physiotherapists had been using Entonox for some years but by equipping ambulance personnel with it, he made a potent form of pain relief available to those who were always the first on scene. Baskett took his idea to the British Oxygen Company (BOC), who were supportive and agreed to make Entonox apparatus available for training at Frenchay hospital. and after a reasonable number of individuals had been trained, a pilot study was run by the Gloucestershire Ambulance Service in which ambulances were crewed by a driver and one of the new, highly trained ambulance men. The results of this trial were published in 1970. The training sessions for ambulance personnel were very time consuming and another solution had to be found.

Baskett visited the manufacturers in Manchester and together they designed a modified ambulance body with facilities for oxygen administration, ECG recording and Entonox. This first vehicle became known as the Mobile Resuscitation Unit (MRU) and was based in a small, specifically-built garage adjacent to the emergency department at Frenchay Hospital. His idea was that, when not actually out on a call, the ambulance personnel having higher training could work in the emergency department. Furthermore, if an emergency call of sufficient seriousness came in, an emergency physician or an anaesthetist could accompany the crew and provide on-scene spot training.

As a member of the International Liaison Committee on Resuscitation (ILCOR) from 1995 to 2000, Baskett developed the international guidelines on airway management during resuscitation, and healthcare professionals across the world respected his expertise on this subject. In 1994, he published one of the first studies on the use of the laryngeal mask airway for in-hospital resuscitation. In 2005, in recognition of Baskett's contributions to resuscitation the American Heart Association awarded him as a 'Resuscitation Giant'.

== Other roles ==
President of the Association of Anaesthetists of Great Britain and Ireland (1990 - 1992), BASICS (1981 - 85), the United Services section of the Royal Society of Medicine (1997–99), the World Association for Emergency and Disaster Medicine (1989–93), the ERC (1989–94), the International Trauma Anaesthsia and Critical Care Society (1995–98), the Triservice Society of Anaesthetists of the South Western Region (1997–98).

Baskett had a long-standing interest in motor sport. In the 1950s he raced minis and was appointed as Chief Medical Officer to Castle Combe circuit in 1968, a position he held until 1995. Following his death in 2008, the Medical Centre at Castle Combe Race Circuit was re-named 'The Peter Baskett Medical Centre'.

In 1983, Baskett joined the Medical Section of the Territorial Army (RAMC). In 1987 he was promoted to the rank of Lt. Colonel and in 1992 was made Colonel and Commanding Officer of 219 Wessex Field Hospital.

Baskett was Editor-in-Chief of the journal Resuscitation from 1997 - 2008.

== Publications ==
Books:

- Use of Droperidol and Fentanyl for Anaesthesia for Ultra Sonic Destruction of the Labyrinth (Chapter) Holderness, M E & Baskett PJF. In Neuroleptanalgesia and Other Practice. Edited Shepard N.W. Published by Pergamon Press 1964.
- Analgesia for Burns Dressings in Children (Chapter) Baskett PJF. In Neue Klinische Aspekte der Neuroleptanalgesie. Edited Henschel W.F. Published by Heinemanns 1977.
- Medical Aspects of Emergency Care (Chapter) Baskett PJF, Zorab J S M. In Rescue Emergency Care. Edited Easton K.C. Published by Heinemanns 1977.
- Immediate Care, Baskett PJF, Zorab J S M. Published W B Sauders Co. Ltd 1977.
- Immediate Prehospital Care, Baskett PJF (Editor and Contributor). Published John Wiley & Son Ltd 1981.
- Involvement of The British Association for Immediate Care in Mobile Coronary Care (Chapter) Baskett PJF. In The Management of the Acute Coronary Attack. Edited Geddes J C. Published Academic Press 1986.
- Medicine for Disasters, Baskett PJF, Weller RM. Published John Wright (now Butterworths) 1988.
- Cardiopulmonary Resuscitation in Anaesthesia, Baskett PJF. Edited Smith & Nimmo W.S. Published Blackwells 1989.
- Cardiopulmonary Resuscitation, Baskett PJF (Editor and Contributor). Published Elsevier 1989.
- Resuscitation Handbook, Baskett PJF. Published Gower Medical 1989. Received 'Society of Authors' Award'.
- Resuscitation Handbook, Baskett PJF. 2nd edn. Published Mosby 1993.
- Trauma Care, A Tale of Woe (Chapter) Baskett PJF. In Saving Lives. Edited Green DG. Published I E A Health & Welfare Unit 1991.
- Textbook of Trauma Anaesthesia & Critical Care. Edited Grande C M. Section Editor Baskett PJF. Published Mosby 1993.
- Trauma Anaesthesia Practice Throughout the World - England (Chapter) Baskett PJF, Sutcliffe AJ and Field Stabilisation (Chapter) Baskett PJF and Anaesthesia & Analgesia in the Field (Chapter) Baskett PJF. In Textbook of Trauma Anaesthesia & Critical Care. Edited Grande C M. Published Mosby 1993.
- Difficult and Impossible Intubation (Chapter) Baskett PJF. Edited Fisher M McD. Clinical Anaesthesiology Series. Published Bailliere 1993.
- Practical Procedures - a Manual for Anaesthesia and Critical Care, Baskett PJF, Nolan J N, Dow AAC and Maull K. Published Mosby 1994.
- The response to major incidents and disasters (Chapter) Baskett PJF. In Textbook of Intensive Care. Edited Goldhall D, Withington S. Published Chapman & Hall.
- Pain Control and Anaesthesia in the A&E Department (Chapter) Baskett PJF, Nolan JP and Management of the Airway in the A&E Department (Chapter) Baskett PJF, Nolan JP, Parr MJ. In The Cambridge Textbook of Emergency Medicine. Edited Skinner D, Peyton R, Robertson C, Swain A and Worlock P. Published Cambridge University Press 1997.
- Simple Management of the Airway and Ventilation (Chapter) Baskett PJF, Nolan JP, Parr MJ and Advanced Management of the Airway and Ventilation (Chapter) Baskett PJF. In Emergency Care - A Text for Paramedics. Edited Greaves I, Hodgetts T, Porter K. Published W B Saunders 1997.
- Basic Airway Management (Chapter) Baskett PJF, Field JM. In The Oxford Textbook of Critical Care. Edited Webb A, Shapiro MJ, Singer M, Suter P. In Press 1998.
