= Choking =

Mechanical obstruction of the flow of air from the environment into the lungs

- Other names: Foreign body airway obstruction
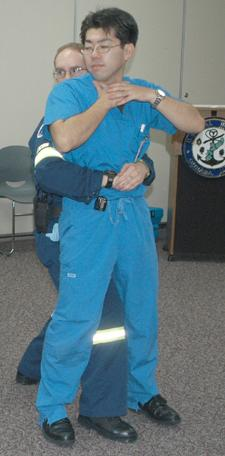
- A demonstration of abdominal thrusts on a person showing signs of choking
- Specialty: Emergency medicine, otorhinolaryngology
- Symptoms: Gasping, wheezing, cyanosis, difficulty speaking, involuntary coughing, clutching of throat, severe respiratory distress, stridor, tachypnea
- Complications: Atelectasis, post-obstructive pneumonia, or bronchiectasis, muteness
- Usual onset: Minutes to days
- Causes: Foreign body aspiration
- Diagnostic method: Based on symptoms, imaging, bronchoscopy
- Treatment: Foreign body removal

Choking, also known as foreign body airway obstruction (FBAO), is a phenomenon that occurs when breathing is impeded by a blockage inside of the respiratory tract. An obstruction that prevents oxygen from entering the lungs results in oxygen deprivation. Although oxygen stored in the blood and lungs can keep a person alive for several minutes after breathing stops, choking often leads to death.

Around 4,500 to 5,000 choking-related deaths occur in the United States every year. Deaths from choking most often occur in the very young (children under three years old) and in the elderly (adults over 75 years). Foods that can adapt their shape to that of the pharynx (such as bananas, marshmallows, or gelatinous candies) are more dangerous. Various forms of specific first aid are used to address and resolve choking.

Choking is the fourth leading cause of unintentional injury death in the United States. Many episodes go unreported because they are brief and resolve without needing medical attention. Of the reported events, 80% occur in people under 15 years of age, and 20% occur in people older than 15 years of age. Worldwide, choking on a foreign object resulted in 162,000 deaths (2.5 per 100,000) in 2013, compared with 140,000 deaths (2.9 per 100,000) in 1990.

== Signs and symptoms ==
Choking victims may present very subtly, especially in the setting of long term foreign body aspiration. Cough is seen in 80% of foreign body aspiration cases, and shortness of breath is seen in 25%. People may be unable to speak, attempt to use hand signals to indicate they are choking, attempt to force vomiting, or clutch at their throat.

=== History of episode ===
An observed or recalled episode of choking, with sudden onset of any of the below respiratory and skin signs and symptoms while eating or handling small objects, is seen in around 90% of choking episodes. Initial episodes typically last seconds to several minutes, but can be followed by symptom improvement that can be mistaken as resolution.

=== Respiratory ===
Initial respiratory symptoms can include involuntary cough, gurgling, gagging, shortness of breath, labored breathing, or wheezing. Children often present with excessive drooling and stridor (high pitched breathing sounds). Classic triad of choking symptoms in children is coughing, wheezing, and diminished breath sounds, however, a 10-year review showed that this grouping of symptoms was present together in only about 60% of patients.

Loss of consciousness may occur if breathing is not restored. In the setting of lower airway aspiration, patients may develop pneumonia like symptoms such as fever, chest pain, foul smelling sputum, or blood in sputum (hemoptysis). In the case of long term foreign body aspiration, patients may present with signs of lobar pneumonia or pleural effusion.

The time a choking victim is still alive without brain damage can vary, but typically brain damage can occur when the patient remains without air for approximately three minutes (it is variable). Death can occur if breathing is not restored in six to ten minutes (varies depending on the person). However, life can be extended by using cardiopulmonary resuscitation for unconscious victims of choking (see more details further below).

=== Skin ===
The face could turn blue (cyanosis) from lack of oxygen if breathing is not restored. Cyanosis may also be seen on the fingertips. In a healthy child or adult, this sign is highly sensitive, but is only observed in 15-20% of choking episodes. Cyanosis is more readily apparent in people with lighter skin tones.

== Causes ==
Respiratory tract

Choking occurs when a foreign body blocks the airway. This obstruction can be located in the pharynx, the larynx, trachea, or lower respiratory tract. The blockage can be either partial (insufficient air passes through to the lungs) or complete (complete blockage of airflow).

Foods that are small, round, or hard pose a high risk of choking. Examples include hard candy, chunks of cheese or hot dogs, nuts, grapes, marshmallows, and popcorn.

Among children, the most common causes of choking are food, coins, toys, and balloons. In one study, peanuts were the most common object found in the airway of children evaluated for suspected foreign body aspiration. Small, round non-food objects such as balls, marbles, toys, and toy parts are also associated with a high risk of choking death because of the potential to completely block a child's airway. Children younger than age three are especially at risk of choking due to lack of fully developed chewing habits, and the tendency to insert object in their mouth as they explore the environment. Because a child's airway is smaller in diameter than that of an adult's, smaller objects can more often cause airway obstruction in children. Additionally, infants and young children generate a less forceful cough than adults, so coughing may not be as effective in relieving airway obstruction.

Risk factors of foreign body airway obstruction for people of any age include the use of alcohol or sedatives, procedures involving the oral cavity or pharynx, oral appliances, or medical conditions that cause difficulty swallowing or impair the cough reflex. Conditions that can cause difficulty swallowing and/or impaired coughing include neurological conditions such as stroke, Alzheimer's disease, or Parkinson's disease. In older adults, risk factors also include living alone, wearing dentures, and having difficulty swallowing. Children and adults with neurological, cognitive, or psychiatric disorders are at an increased risk of choking and may experience a delay in diagnosis because there may not be a known history of a foreign body entering the airway.

Choking on food is only one type of airway obstruction; others include blockage due to tumors, swelling and inflammation of the airway tissues (from organic foreign bodies or another reason), and compression of the laryngopharynx, larynx, or vertebrate trachea in strangulation. Foreign bodies can also enter the reparatory tract through the chest wall, such as in the setting of a gunshot injury.

== Diagnosis ==
Recognition and diagnosis of choking primarily involves identification of the signs and symptoms like coughing and wheezing (see Signs and Symptoms). Immediate recognition of the symptoms is important, but based on the short length of some episodes, diagnosis during the first 24 hours only occurs in 50–60% of cases.

After the initial episode, choking can lead to an obstruction of the airway that prompts further diagnostic steps. For choking episodes that require emergent evaluation by a doctor, several tools can be used for diagnosis, each with their advantages and drawbacks.

=== Imaging and visualization methods ===
Use of bronchoscopy to visualize the respiratory tract.

Bronchoscopy
According to the American Heart Association, bronchoscopy is a reliable method used to visualize the cause of choking when not resolved via oxygen and supportive care. Bronchoscopy also is a crucial tool in foreign body removal after supportive care has been provided and the person who is choking is stable. However, bronchoscopy is an invasive form of imaging and intervention in comparison to the below diagnostic tools, and requires sedation to perform.
X-ray
An X-ray uses high-frequency electromagnetic radiation to visualize the human body. In the case of choking, a chest X-ray is obtained to visualize the lungs and upper airway. However, many objects do not show up on X-ray (radiolucent). About 10% objects are radio-opaque and can be visualized using X-ray. X-rays are more accessible than other imaging modalities but expose a person to radiation. In cases where X-ray is inconclusive, fluoroscopy may be able to demonstrate radiolucent or smaller foreign bodies. Chest fluoroscopy is a real-time X-ray image (sometimes referred to as an X-ray movie) to view breathing and coughing.
Computerized tomography (CT)
A CT scan uses a tube with multiple X-ray machines to build a 3D image from 2D X-ray images of multiple cross-sections. Radiolucent objects can be better captured on CT than X-ray. Additionally, modern imaging analysis software allows for airway reconstruction following a chest CT, creating a model of the airway network in the lungs that can better visualize the exast location of a foreign body. Since a CT is multiple X-rays, the exposure to radiation is significantly greater.
Magnetic resonance imaging (MRI)
An MRI scan uses radio-frequency pulse under a magnetic field to create a high-resolution image of the body. MRIs can detect foreign bodies with higher accuracy than X-ray or CT. MRI does not expose the person to radiation. Drawbacks of MRI include claustrophobia and high cost. For children, sedation may be required to undergo MRI imaging, which is an increased risk when the airway is already potentially compromised.

== Treatment ==
Airway management is used to restore a person's ventilation which consists of severity assessment, procedural planning, and may consist of multiple treatment modalities to restore airway.

Treatments will vary based on severity and stage of airway blockage. In basic airway management, treatment generally consists of anti-choking first aid techniques, such as the Heimlich maneuver. In advanced airway management, complex clinical methods are used.

=== Basic treatment (first aid) ===
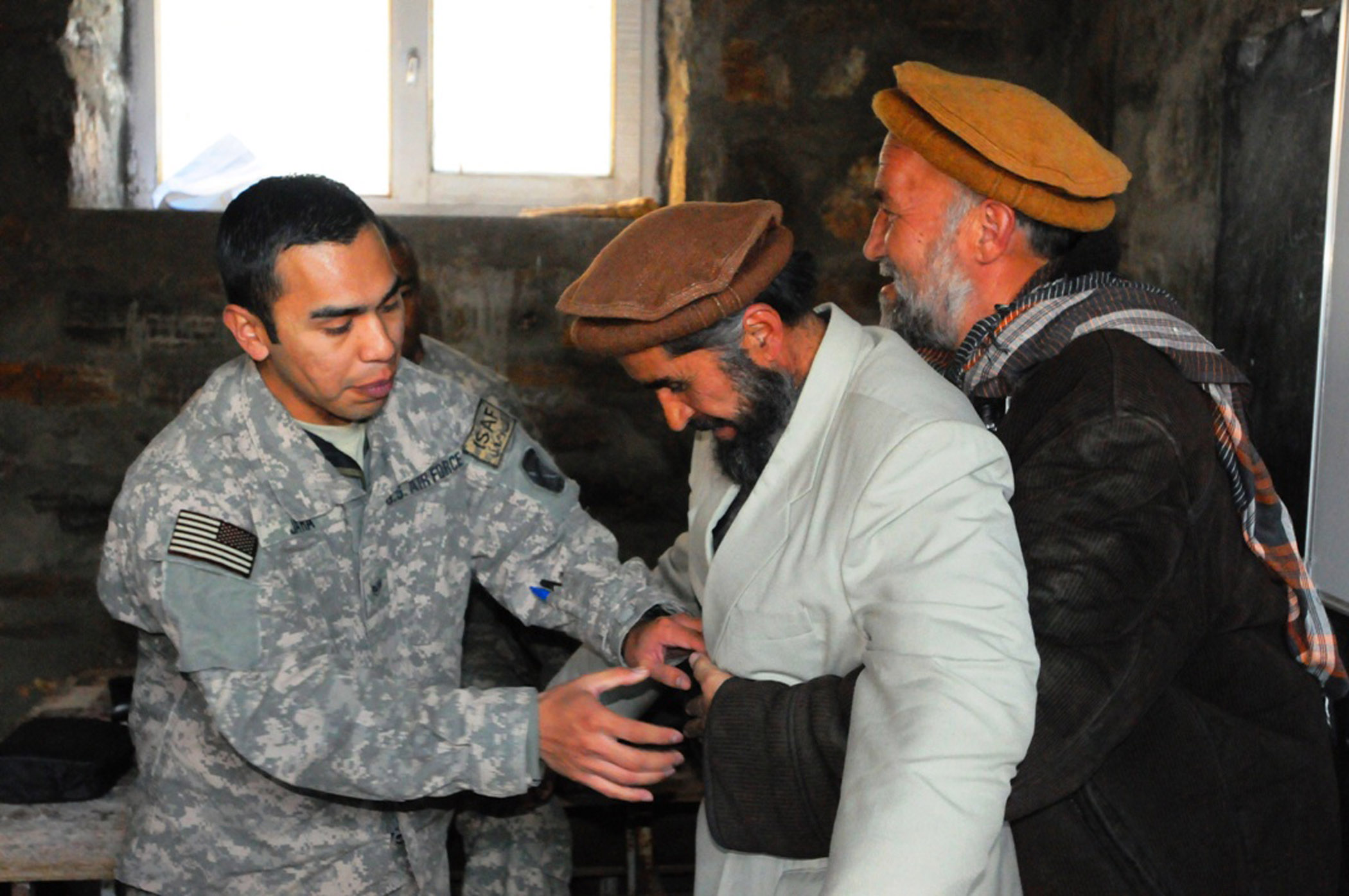
US medic teaches the abdominal thrusts to Afghans

Basic treatment of choking includes several non-invasive techniques to help remove foreign bodies from the airways.

==== General strategy: "five and five" ====
For a conscious choking victim, most institutions such as the American Heart Association, the American Red Cross and the NHS, recommend the same general protocol of first-aid: encouraging the victim to cough, followed by hard back slaps (as described below). If these attempts are not effective, the procedure continues with abdominal thrusts (the Heimlich maneuver) or chest thrusts if the victim cannot receive abdominal pressure (as described below).

If none of these techniques are effective, protocol by various institutions recommend alternating the series of back slaps and series of thrusts (these on the abdomen or chest, depending on the victim), 5 times of each technique and repeat ("five and five").

This procedure has modifications for infants (babies under 1 year-old), for the people with problems in the belly as the pregnant or extremely obese people, for the disabled victims in wheelchair, for the victims that lay on the bed but are unable to sit up, and for the victims that lay on the floor but are unable to sit up.

In scenarios when the first aid procedures are not resolving the choking, it is necessary to call to emergency medical services, but administration of first aid should be continued until they arrive.

Each one of the techniques in the first aid protocol against choking are detailed below:

==== Cough ====
If the choking victim is conscious and can cough, the American Red Cross and the Mayo Clinic recommend encouraging them to stay calm and continue coughing freely.

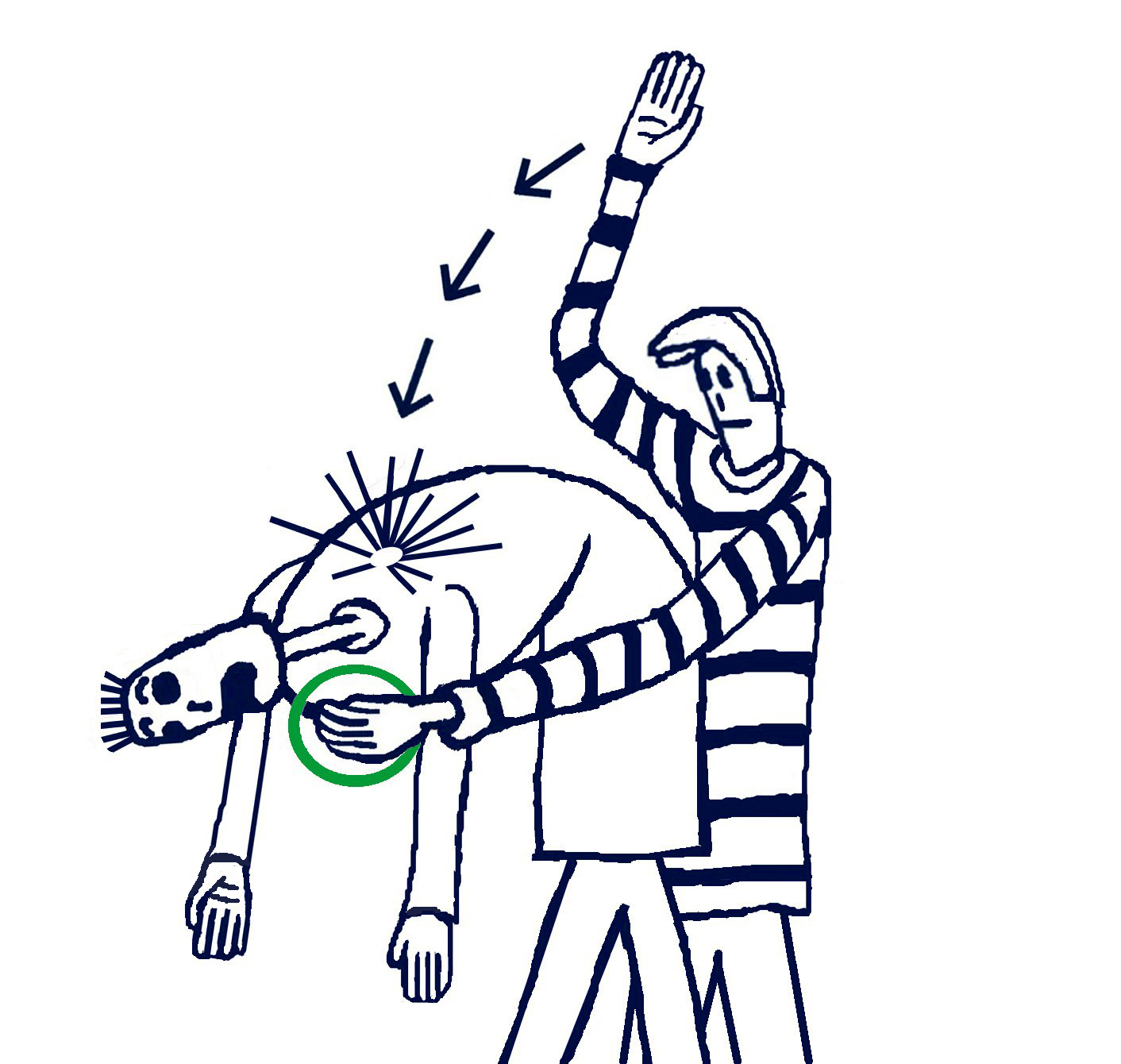
Back blows anti-choking technique: Bend the victim forward as much as possible. Support the victim's chest with one hand and then apply firm slaps on the back with the other hand.

==== Back blows (back slaps) ====
Many associations, including the American Red Cross and the Mayo Clinic, recommend the use of back blows (back slaps) to aid a choking victim. This technique is performed by bending the choking victim forward as much as possible, even trying to place their head lower than the chest, to avoid the blows driving the object deeper into the person's throat (a rare complication, but possible). The bending is in the back, while the neck should not be excessively bent. It is convenient that one hand supports the victim's chest. Then the back blows are performed by delivering forceful slaps with the heel of the other hand on the victim's back, between the shoulder blades.

The back slaps push behind the blockage to expel the foreign object out. In some cases, the physical vibration of the action may cause enough movement to clear the airway.

==== Abdominal thrusts (Heimlich maneuver) ====
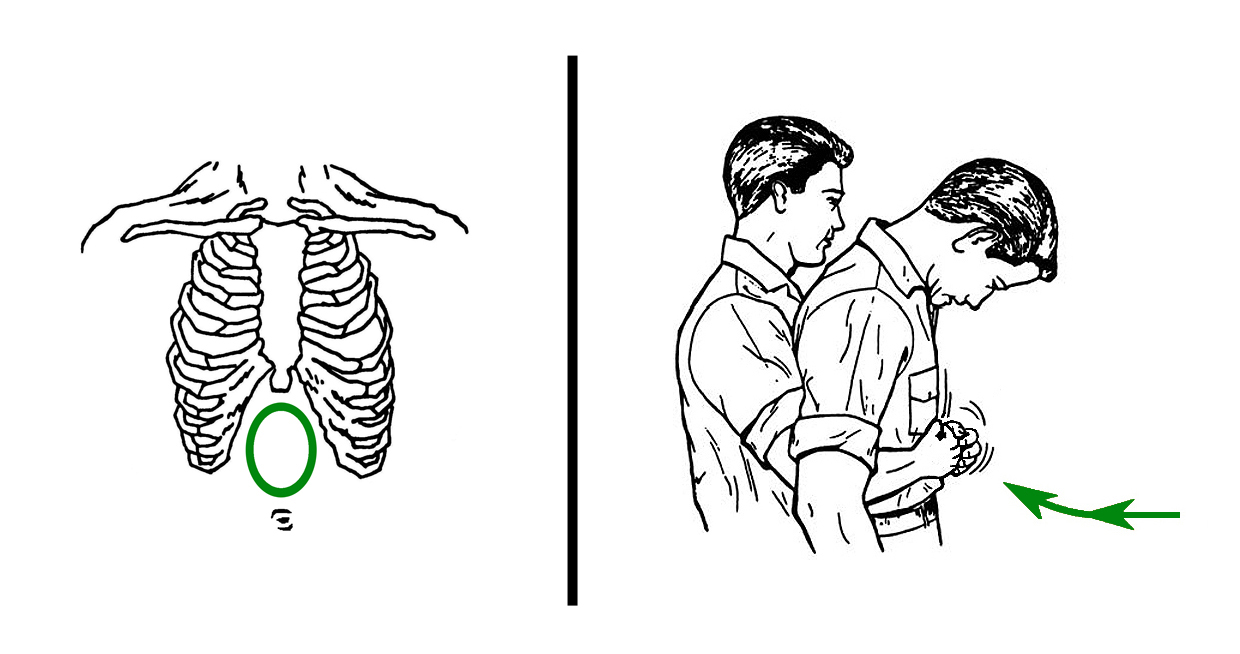
Abdominal thrusts anti-choking technique: Embrace the victim's abdomen from behind and then apply strong compressions on the area located between the chest and the belly button.

Abdominal thrusts are performed with the rescuer embracing the belly of the choking victim from behind. Then, the rescuer closes their own dominant hand, grasps it with the other hand, and presses forcefully with them on the area located between the chest and the belly button of the victim, in a direction of in-and-up. This method tries to create enough pressure upwards to expel the object that obstructs the airway. The strength is not focused directly against the ribs, to avoid breaking them. If the first thrust does not solve the choking, it can be repeated several times.

The use of abdominal thrusts is not recommended for infants under 1 year of age due to risk of causing injury, so there are adaptations for babies (see more details further below), but a child that is too big for the babies' adaptations would require normal abdominal thrusts (according to the size of the body). Besides, abdominal thrusts should not be used when the victim's abdomen presents problems to receive them, such as pregnancy or excessive size; in these cases, chest thrusts are advised (see more details further below).

Although the use of the Heimlich Maneuver has saved many lives, it can produce harms if not performed correctly. This includes rib fracture, perforation of the jejunum, and diaphragmatic herniation, among others.

==== Chest thrusts ====
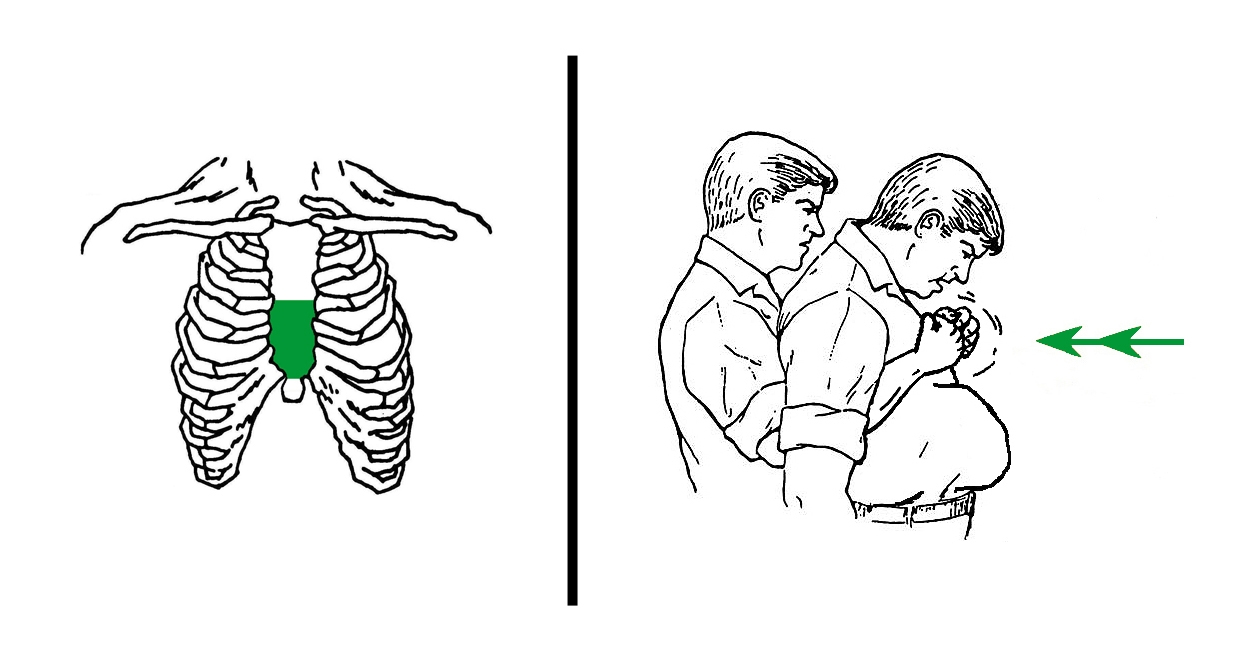
Chest thrusts anti-choking technique: If the victim cannot receive thrusts on the abdomen, use chest thrusts. Embrace the victim's chest from behind and then apply strong compressions on the lower half of the chest bone, but not in the very endpoint. Avoid sticking the knuckles too painfully.

The use of chest thrusts is advised when abdominal thrusts cannot be performed effectively, as in the cases of a victim with serious abdominal injuries, pregnancy, or a belly size that is too large for that.

Chest thrusts are performed with the rescuer embracing the chest of the choking victim from behind. Then, the rescuer closes the own dominant hand and grasps it with the other hand. This can produce several kinds of fists, but any of them can be valid if it can be placed on the victim's chest without sinking a knuckle too painfully. Keeping the fist with both hands, the rescuer uses it to press forcefully inwards on the lower half of the chest bone (sternum). The pressure is not focused on the very endpoint (named xiphoid process) to avoid breaking it. When the victim is a woman, the zone of the pressure of the chest thrusts would normally be above the level of the breasts. If the first thrust does not solve the choking, it can be repeated several times.

==== Anti-choking devices ====
Since 2015, several anti-choking devices were developed and released to the market. They are based on a mechanical vacuum effect, without a power source. Most use an attached mask to make a vacuum from the patient's nose and mouth. The current models of anti-choking devices are quite similar: a direct plunger tool (LifeVac and Willnice) and a vacuum syringe (backward syringe) that also keeps the tongue in place by inserting a tube in the mouth (Dechoker). Other mechanical models are in development, such as Lifewand, which creates a vacuum by direct pressure against the patient's face. However, these products have not been well-studied in clinical trials or pre-hospital settings and literature is relatively sparse given the challenges in trial design.

A 2020 systematic review of the effectiveness of the three devices listed concluded that "there is insufficient evidence to support or discourage their use" and recommended that "practitioners should continue to adhere to guidelines authored by local resuscitation authorities which align with ILCOR recommendations." In October 2024 the American Red Cross updated its guidelines to include that “an anti-choking device is now part of the recommended guidelines to be used in the event of protocol failure or when traditional methods cannot be administered.”

A 2023 study of LifeVac and DeChoker found, “With the exception of the LifeVac removing saltine crackers, all trials were entirely unsuccessful in relieving foreign body aspiration. Additionally, both devices may cause significant pressure and injury to the oral cavity,” and concluded, “bystanders should continue to follow ILCOR guidelines on resuscitation to aid with relieving foreign body aspiration.”

In April 2024, the U.S. FDA issued a Safety Communication stating that it, “encourages the public to follow established choking rescue protocols, which are step-by-step guides approved by the American Red Cross and the American Heart Association... These rescue protocols include a combination of back blows and/or abdominal thrusts (also called the “Heimlich” maneuver) for adults and children. The protocols do not include using anti-choking devices... The FDA is aware of reports describing problems with the use of anti-choking devices. These problems include failure to resolve a choking incident due to lack of suction, bruising around the face, lips, and mouth, and scratches in the back of the throat.” In November 2025, the same Safety Communication was updated stating that the FDA “[took] actions to address the marketing of unauthorized anti-choking devices, including issuing Warning Letters and an Import Alert,” specifically citing warning letters issued to the companies making LifeVac and DeChoker products, and a more general import alert “listing multiple suction anti-choking devices that have not been authorized for distribution in the U.S.”

Some products like Act Fast Anti Choking Trainer are used by healthcare providers as well as schools in CPR training courses.

In February, 2026, media received a letter that choking rescue device the LifeVac that has been donated to police departments across Florida and sold nationwide for nearly a decade has never received FDA approval and may "put the public health and safety at risk." The device has been distributed to first responders throughout Florida, including Tampa Police, which received 300 units as a donation last June. The Food and Drug Administration issued a warning letter to LifeVac LLC in September 2025, stating the device should not be marketed or sold without proper approval. However, the FDA re-evaluated their decision and gave the LifeVac an updated classification as a Class II medical device in early 2026.

==== Unconscious victims ====
A choking victim who becomes unconscious must be gently caught before falling and placed lying face-up on a surface. That surface should be firm enough (it is recommended placing a layer of something on the floor and laying the victim above).

Emergency medical services should be summoned, if this has not already been done.

It can be also convenient that any rescuer asks for a defibrillator around (an AED, as those devices are commonplace), just in case it can be necessary to treat the victim's heart.

Chest compressions of cardiopulmonary resuscitation (CPR), proper rhythm.

The anti-choking cardiopulmonary resuscitation (CPR) for unconscious adults and children is quite similar to any other CPR, but with some modifications:

In a first step, a series of 30 chest compressions are applied on the lower half of the sternum (the bone that is along the middle of the chest from the neck to the belly) at an approximate rhythm of nearly 2 per second.

After that series, the rescuer looks for the obstructing object and, if it is already visible, the rescuer makes a try to extract it, usually by using a finger sweeping (hopefully from the mouth). Normally, the object would be a food bolus (and not the epiglottis, a cartilaginous flap of the throat). It is also possible to try to extract it when it is deeper and not visible, always carefully: using the fingers to take it, or lifting the victim's chin to form a straight way to the throat while the victim is face up (face down in case of the victim's tongue obstructs too much, or on a side with a base under the head) and then grasping or sweeping the stuck object with tools: thin kitchen tweezers, scissors (these used with care), forks and spoons (in a reverse position: introducing their handle) or even a toothpick (if other instruments were too big for the case); however, the protocols do not recommend extracting the obstructing object if it is not visible (a blind extraction), because of the risk to sink it deeper by accident, and because the compressions could move the object outside by themselves (in some cases). Moreover, if any removal is tried and is taking too much time, it may require alternating it with the chest compressions at some moments, without hindering to the extraction. And, whether the object has been found and removed in this step or not, the CPR procedure must pass to the next step and continue until the victims can breathe by themselves or emergency medical services arrive.

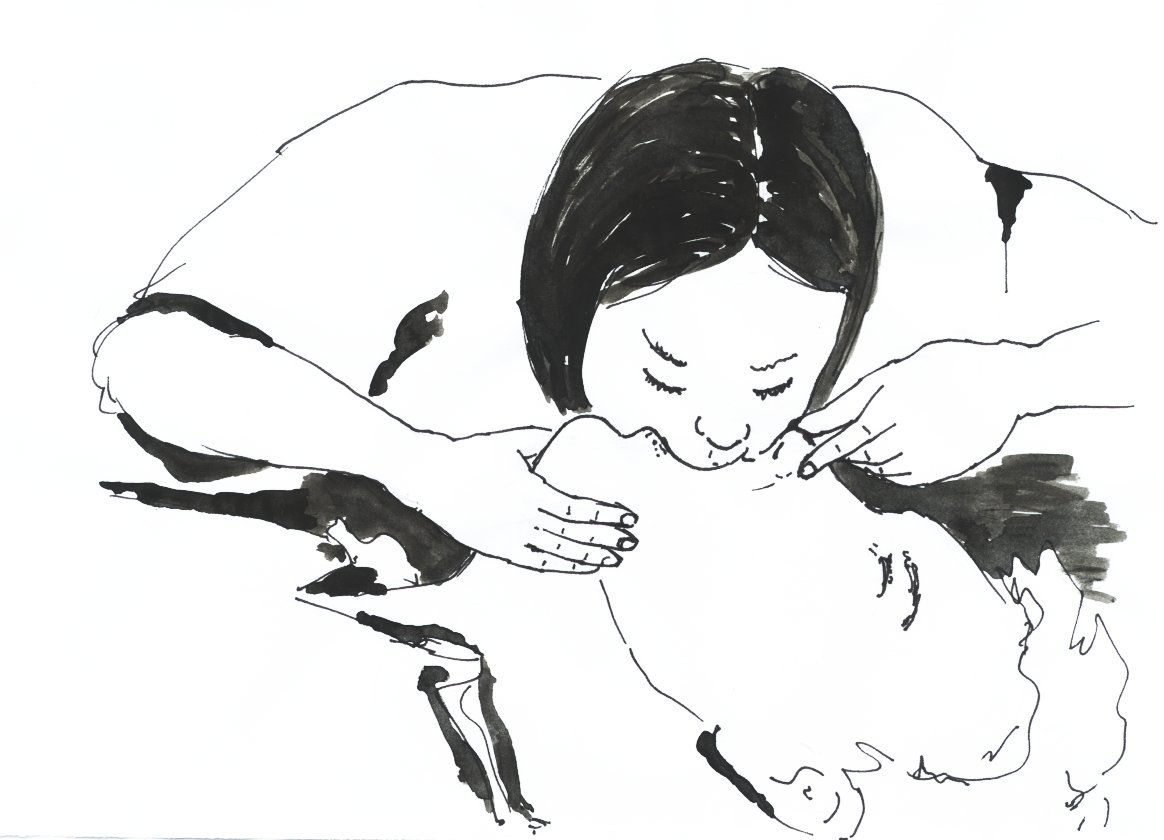
Rescue breaths of cardiopulmonary resuscitation (CPR).

In the next step of the CPR, it is recommended that the rescuer applies a rescue breath, pinching the victim's nose and puffing air inside of the mouth. Rescue breaths would usually fail while the obstructing object is blocking the entrance of air. This can be resolved by tilting the victim's head up and down, thus altering the shape of the airway and attempting to open an entrance for the air, and then giving another rescue breath. After the rescue breaths, this resuscitation returns to the 30 initial compressions, in a cycle that repeats continually, until the victim regains consciousness and breathes, or until the object is extracted.

Unconscious choking may lead to cardiac arrest, in which case defibrillation is needed. It is convenient to ask around for a defibrillator, such as an AED, to be used on a victim that remains in cardiac arrest after having extracted the stuck object (if it has been extracted, and only after that). An AED is designed to be easy to use by an untrained person by guiding the user with voice instructions.

===== Finger sweeping =====
It is crucial to avoid blindingly sweeping the airway unless there is direct visualization of the airway – in fact, these procedures are advised only to be performed in more controlled environments such as an operating room. In unconscious choking victims, the American Medical Association has previously advocated sweeping the fingers across the back of the throat to attempt to dislodge airway obstructions. Many modern protocols suggest other treatment modalities are superior. Red Cross procedures also advise rescuers not to perform a finger sweep unless an object can be clearly seen in the victim's mouth to prevent driving the obstruction deeper into the victim's airway. Other protocols suggest that if the patient is conscious they will be able to remove the foreign object themselves, or if they are unconscious, the rescuer should place them in the recovery position to allow the drainage of fluids out of the mouth instead of down the trachea due to gravity. There is also a risk of causing further damage (inducing vomiting, for instance) by using a finger sweep technique. There are no studies that have examined the usefulness of the finger sweep technique when there is no visible object in the airway. Recommendations for the use of the finger sweep have been based on anecdotal evidence.

=== Particular cases ===
==== Infants (babies under 1 year-old) ====
The majority of choking injuries and fatalities occur in children aged 0–4, highlighting the importance for widespread dissemination of the appropriate anti-choking techniques for these age groups. In fact, it has been shown that increased parental education may decrease choking rates among children.

For infants under 1 year-old, the American Heart Association recommends adapted procedures. The size of the children's body is the most important aspect in determining the correct anti-choking technique. So the normal first aid techniques against choking would be tried in children who are too large for the babies' procedures (or they would be tried as a less appropriated attempt if the rescuer is unable to perform the techniques for babies).

First aid for choking infants alternates a cycle of special back blows (five back slaps) followed by special chest thrusts (five adapted chest compressions).

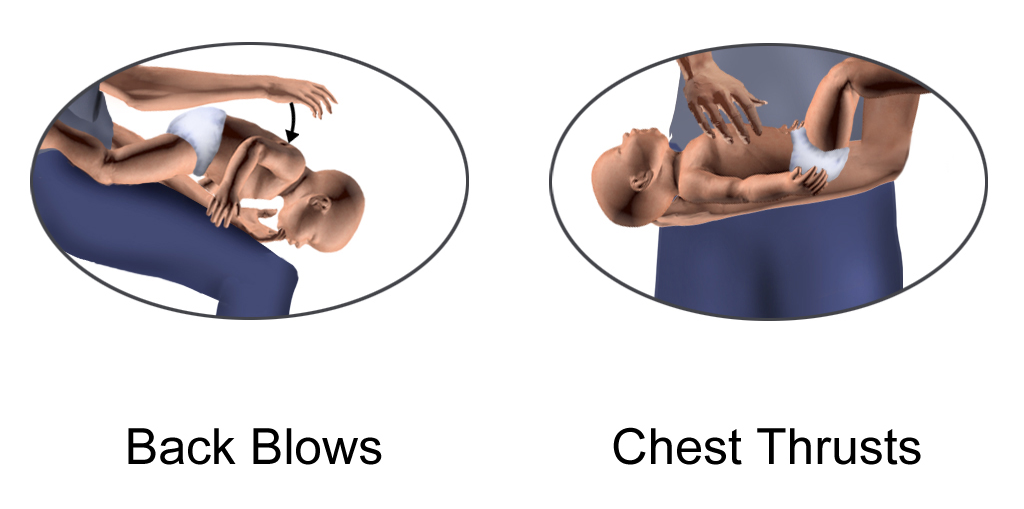
Left: 'Back blows for infants', the baby receives the slaps being carefully held and slightly placed upside-down; a support under the chest is recommended. Right: 'Chest thrusts for infants', two fingers press on the lower half of the middle of the chest.

In the back blows maneuver, the rescuer slaps on the baby's back. It is recommended that the baby receive them being slightly leaned upside-down on an inclination. There exist several ways to achieve this:

According to a widely propagated modality: the rescuer sits down on a seat with the baby, and supports the baby with a forearm and its respective hand. The baby's head must be carefully held with that hand (approximately by the face), and kept in a normal position, facing forward, not inclinated. Then the baby's body can be leaned forward upside-down along the rescuer's thighs, and receive the slaps.

As an easier alternative: the rescuer can sit on a bed or sofa, or even the floor, carrying the baby. Next, the rescuer should support the baby's body on the own lap, to lean the baby a bit upside-down at the right or the left of the lap. The baby's head must be in a normal position, facing forward, frontally, and not inclinated. It is always convenient that the baby's chest is supported against something. Then the rescuer would slap the back of the baby.

If the rescuer cannot sit down: at least it is possible to attempt the manoeuver at a low height and over a soft surface. Then the rescuer would support the baby with a forearm and the hand of that side, holding carefully the baby's head with that hand (approximately by the face, but always trying that the baby's head keeps in a normal position, facing forward, not inclinated). The baby's body would be leaned upside-down in that position to receive the slaps. In situations with rescuers who cannot do all of that (as rescuers with disabilities and others), they can still try the normal back blows, supporting the baby's chest with one hand, bending the baby's body, and then giving firm slaps with the other hand.

In the chest thrusts manoeuver, the baby's body is placed lying face up on a surface (it can be the rescuer's thighs, lap or forearm). Then, the rescuer does the compressions pressing with only two fingers on the lower half of the bone that is along the middle of the chest from the neck to the belly (on the chest bone, named sternum, on its part that is the nearest to the belly). Abdominal thrusts are not recommended in children less than one year old because they can cause liver damage.

The back blows and chest thrusts are alternated in cycles of five back blows and five chest compressions until the object comes out of the infant's airway or until the infant becomes unconscious.

If choking is unresolved despite these rescue attempts, it is vital that somebody calls to the emergency medical services and continue first aid until they arrive. An infant can fall unconscious soon, then an anti-choking resuscitation for infants is required (read next).

===== Unconscious infants =====
An unconscious infant has to be placed face-up on a firm and horizontal surface (as the floor). The baby's head must be in a straight position, facing frontally, because tilting it too much backwards can close the windpipe (trachea) in infants.

Emergency medical services should be summoned, and an automated external defibrillator (AED) should be retrieved.

Until emergency services arrive, the American Heart Association recommends starting cardiopulmonary resuscitation (CPR) adapted to infants (<1 year old). It is a cycle of resuscitation that alternates compressions and rescue breaths, like in a normal CPR, but with some differences: The rescuer begins by making 30 compressions, pressing, with two thumbs or the heel of one's hand, on the lower half of the bone in the middle of the chest (the sternum, on its part that is the nearest to the belly), at an approximate rate of nearly 2 per second (100-120 compressions per minute).

At the end of the round of compressions, the rescuer looks into the mouth for the obstructing object. And, if it is already visible, the rescuer makes a try to extract it (usually using a finger sweep). The rescuer must not confuse a foreign object with epiglottis: a cartilaginous flap of the throat, nor with uvula: a piece of flesh in the back of the mouth. Current protocols do not recommend attempting to extract the object if it is not visible (a blind extraction) because of the risk to sink it deeper by accident. In total, no more than ten seconds should be spent without doing compressions. If the object cannot be immediately extracted, this CPR procedure must continue to the next action and continue until the babies can breathe by themselves or emergency medical services arrive.

In the next step of the CPR, the rescuer makes a rescue breath, covering the baby's mouth and nose simultaneously with their own mouth, and gently exhaling one time. The goal of a rescue breath is to observe the rise and fall of the chest, indicating that air has reached the lungs. However, one should be careful so as to not overinflate the baby's lungs; a rescuer should not attempt to blow against resistance. After two rescue breaths, the rescuer must return to the 30 initial compressions, repeating the same resuscitation cycle again, continually, until the choking baby regains consciousness and begins to breathe normally, or until emergency help arrives.

Defibrillation may be needed, as a choking infant that is already unconscious can suffer a cardiac arrest at any moment due to hypoxia. AEDs, which are available in many public places, are designed to be safe and easy to use; they announce instructions with voice messages, and the device will not shock a patient who does not require defibrillation. One of the pads of the AED is attached to the baby's chest, and the other pad to the baby's back.

==== Pregnant or extremely obese people ====
Some choking victims cannot receive pressure on their bellies. Then, the American Heart Associated recommends substituting the abdominal thrusts for chest thrusts.

These victims can include: patients with serious injuries in the abdomen, pregnant women, and obese patients; however, in the case of the obese victims, a rescuer who is capable enough to effectively wrap their arms around the circumference of the victim's abdomen, and thinks that it is possible to apply the abdominal thrusts effectively there, can try them as in the normal first aid against choking (see details further above).

Chest thrusts are performed in a similar way to the abdominal thrusts, but with the fist placed on the lower half of the vertical bone that is along the middle of the chest (the chest bone, named sternum), rather than on the abdomen. As a reference, in women, the zone of pressure of the chest thrusts would be normally higher than the breasts. It is convenient to avoid placing the knuckles too painfully. Finally, strong inward thrusts are then applied.

The rest of the first aid protocol is the same, starting with asking the victim to cough freely, and then, if the victim cannot cough, the series of chest thrust are alternated with series of slaps on the back. Those back slaps are applied normally: bending forward the back of the victims and supporting their chest with one hand.

If choking remains unresolved, calling to emergency medical services is vital, but first aid should be continued until they arrive.

When the victims with abdominal problems become unconscious, they need the same anti-choking cardiopulmonary resuscitation procedure that is employed for other unconscious choking victims (see details further above).

==== In wheelchair-using victims ====
If the choking victim is a wheelchair-using person, the procedure is similar to how it is for other victims. The main difference is in trying to apply the techniques directly, while the victim is using the wheelchair.

Coughing should be encouraged first before applying the techniques. When the victim cannot cough, it is recommended alternating series of back blows and thrusts, as in other cases.

Back blows (back slaps) can be used after substantially bending forward the back of the victim, and supporting the victim's chest with the other hand.

Abdominal and chest thrusts can also be used. To perform the abdominal thrusts, the rescuer must get behind the wheelchair. Then, the rescuer can embrace the victim's abdomen from behind and above, leaning over the top of the wheelchair's backrest. If this is too difficult, the rescuer can get down and embrace from behind the victim's abdomen and the wheelchair's backrest all together. In narrow spaces that cannot be opened, the position can be achieved by turning the victim to one side. Finally, the rescuer would grasp the own hand with the other, place them between the chest and the belly button of the victim, and apply sudden pressures with them on that zone, in a direction of in-and-up. If the victim cannot receive abdominal thrusts (in cases as having serious injuries in the belly, pregnancy, and others), chest thrusts must be used instead. They are applied while the victim is using the wheelchair too, but making sudden inward pressures on the lower half of the breast bone (sternum), which is placed vertically along the middle of the chest. If the space is too narrow and impossible to widen, the abdominal or chest thrusts can be tried by turning the victim to one side.

Rescuers should alternate between back slaps and chest thrusts repeatedly until the choking is solved, as in other victims.

If choking remains unresolved, calling to emergency medical services is vital, but first aid should be continued until they arrive.

If a wheelchair-using victim of choking becomes unconscious, anti-choking cardiopulmonary resuscitation (CPR) should be performed, which is the same method also used for able-bodied victims of choking. That said, it can be noted that the victim needs to be removed from the wheelchair and laid face-up on an appropriated surface (not too hard or too soft, and it is possible to put a layer of something between the floor and the victim). While they are on their way, the rescuer should apply anti-choking cardiopulmonary resuscitation for unconscious victims (see details further above).

==== On the bed but unable to sit up ====
If the choking victim is lying in bed, but is conscious and unable to sit up (such as in patients with disabilities or injuries), the first aid would be the same, but performed by sitting the patient on the edge of the bed.

Before adjusting the patient's position, the rescuer encourages the victim to cough freely and as forcefully as they can manage. The victim would do it better by turning to one side. When coughing is too difficult or impossible, the rescuer would sit the victim on the bed's edge, to make coughing easier or to apply the anti-choking manoeuvers (these are required if the victim cannot cough).

This can be achieved grasping the victim by the legs (behind of the knees, or by the calves or ankles) and rotating them until they are out of the bed. Next, the rescuer would sit the victim up on the edge, pulling the shoulders or arms (in the forearms or wrists). Then it is possible to apply the anti-choking manoeuvers from behind: series of back slaps (after leaning the victim forward, and supporting the chest with one hand) and series of abdominal thrusts (sudden compressions on the part of the victim's belly that is between the chest and the belly button, in a direction of in-and-up). When the victim cannot receive abdominal thrusts (in cases as having serious injuries in the belly, pregnancy, and others), the rescuer needs to change them for chest thrusts (sudden pressures inward on the lower half of the breast bone, which is placed vertically along the middle of the chest, from the neck to the belly).

When a rescuer cannot sit the victim up, it is possible to perform chest or abdominal thrusts frontally while the victim is lying on the bed (despite they would be less effective in that horizontal position). They are made by putting one hand on the top of the other and making with both of them strong pressures downwards on the lower half of the breast bone (the sternum), or in a downward-and-frontward direction between the chest and the belly button.

If choking remains unresolved, calling to emergency medical services is vital, but first aid should be continued until they arrive.

When the victims of choking in bed become unconscious, they need the same anti-choking cardiopulmonary resuscitation procedure that is employed for other unconscious choking victims (see details further above).

==== On the floor but unable to sit up ====
It is possible, though rare, that a choking victim would be laying on the floor but conscious. For example, someone having a disability that makes impossible to sit up and to keep standing up on the feet. If this is the case, the first aid is the same, but after sitting the victim on the floor.

Before adjusting the patient's position, the rescuer asks the victim to cough freely and with strength. The victim would cough better by turning to a side. If coughing is too difficult or impossible, the rescuer would sit the victim up, to make it easier or to apply anti-choking maneuvers (these are needed when the victim cannot cough).

A rescuer would sit the victim up by pulling the shoulders or arms (in the forearms or wrists). When the victim is sitting up, the rescuer can sit behind to apply the anti-choking manoeuvers: back slaps (after bending very much the back of the victim, and supporting the chest with one hand) and abdominal thrusts (sudden compressions in a direction of in-and-up, on the part of the victim's belly that is between the chest and the belly button). When victims cannot receive abdominal thrusts properly (as the seriously injured in the belly, and the pregnant women), the rescuer needs to change them for chest thrusts (sudden pressures inward on the lower half of the breast bone, which is placed vertically along the middle of the chest, from the neck to the belly).

In some situations it is impossible to sit the victim up, and then the rescuer can try one of the thrusts techniques to the front of their abdomen and chest (even though this is less effective, it could be the only option and therefore worth a try). Anyway, they can be made by putting one hand on the top of the other and using them to make strong pressures downwards on the lower half of the breast bone (the sternum), or downwards-and-frontwards on the abdomen (between the chest and the belly button).

If choking remains unresolved, calling to emergency medical services is vital, but first aid should be continued until they arrive.

If the victim is unconscious, it is needed the same anti-choking cardiopulmonary resuscitation procedure that is used in other unconscious choking victims (see details further above).

==== Seizing victim ====
Seizing can occur for a multitude of reasons, but is common in those diagnosed with epilepsy. During a seizure, victims may experience strangulation or throat constriction during consciousness. The victim will not have control of their bodily functions and will need someone to create a safe area for them. One should clear a space where the victim can lay down and remove or loosen anything that is around their neck. Then one should turn them on their side as to help them breathe and to avoid potential choking on the saliva.

=== Self-treatment ===
First aid anti-choking techniques can be applied on oneself if others are not around to perform general first aid. One recommended response consists of positioning ones own abdomen over the border of an object: usually a chair back, but it could work on an armchair, railing or countertop, and then driving the abdomen upon the border, making sharp thrusts in an inwards-an-upwards direction. It is possible to place a fist or both fists between the chosen border and the belly, to increase the pressure of the maneuver and make it easier (depending on the situation). It is also possible trying to fall on the edge, aiming to achieve more pressure in that way. Other variation of this consists in pressing one's own belly with an appropriated object, in an inwards-and-upwards direction.

Additionally, abdominal thrusts can be self-applied only with the hands. This is achieved by making a fist, grasping it with the other hand, and placing them on the area located between the chest and the belly button. Then the body is bent forward and the hands make strong compressions pressing in an inwards-an-upwards direction. One study concluded that the self-administered abdominal thrusts were as effective as those performed by another person.

When certain scenarios make it impossible for self treatment with abdominal thrust (serious injuries, pregnancy, or obesity), the self application of chest thrusts is recommended, although more difficult. This would be achieved by leaning the body forward, making a fist, grasping it with the other hand, and doing strong compressions inwards with both of them on the lower half of the chest bone (the sternum, the bone that crosses vertically the middle of the chest). It is convenient to relax the chest for a better reception. Other variation of this is the use of an appropriated object to press inwards in the same point, being equally convenient to receive the compressions when the chest is relaxed.

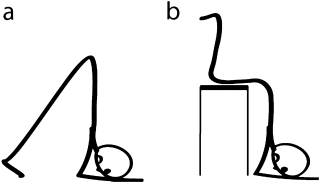
Head-down position for self-treatment of choking if other approaches fail.

Making attempts to cough, when it is possible, can also aid in clearing the airway.

Alternatively, multiple sources of evidence suggest applying the head-down (inverse) position. is a promising self treatment. To perform this manoeuver, put your hands on the floor and then place the knees on an upper seat (as on a bed, a sofa, or an armchair). Additional movements up or down can be attempted in this position.

=== Advanced treatment ===
There are many advanced medical treatments available to relieve choking or airway obstruction, including the removal of a foreign object with the help of a laryngoscope or bronchoscope.

A cricothyrotomy may be performed as an emergency procedure when the stuck object cannot be removed. This is an intervention that involves severing a little opening in the patient's neck (between the thyroid cartilage and the cricoid cartilage, until reaching the trachea) and inserting there a tube to introduce air through it, bypassing the upper airways. Usually, this procedure is only performed by someone with knowledge about it and surgical skills, when the patient is already unconscious.

== Prevention ==
The time to react to choking is quite brief, and choking can be lethal in the worst cases. For these reasons, it is convenient to prevent it, so that it does not happen.

=== General prevention ===
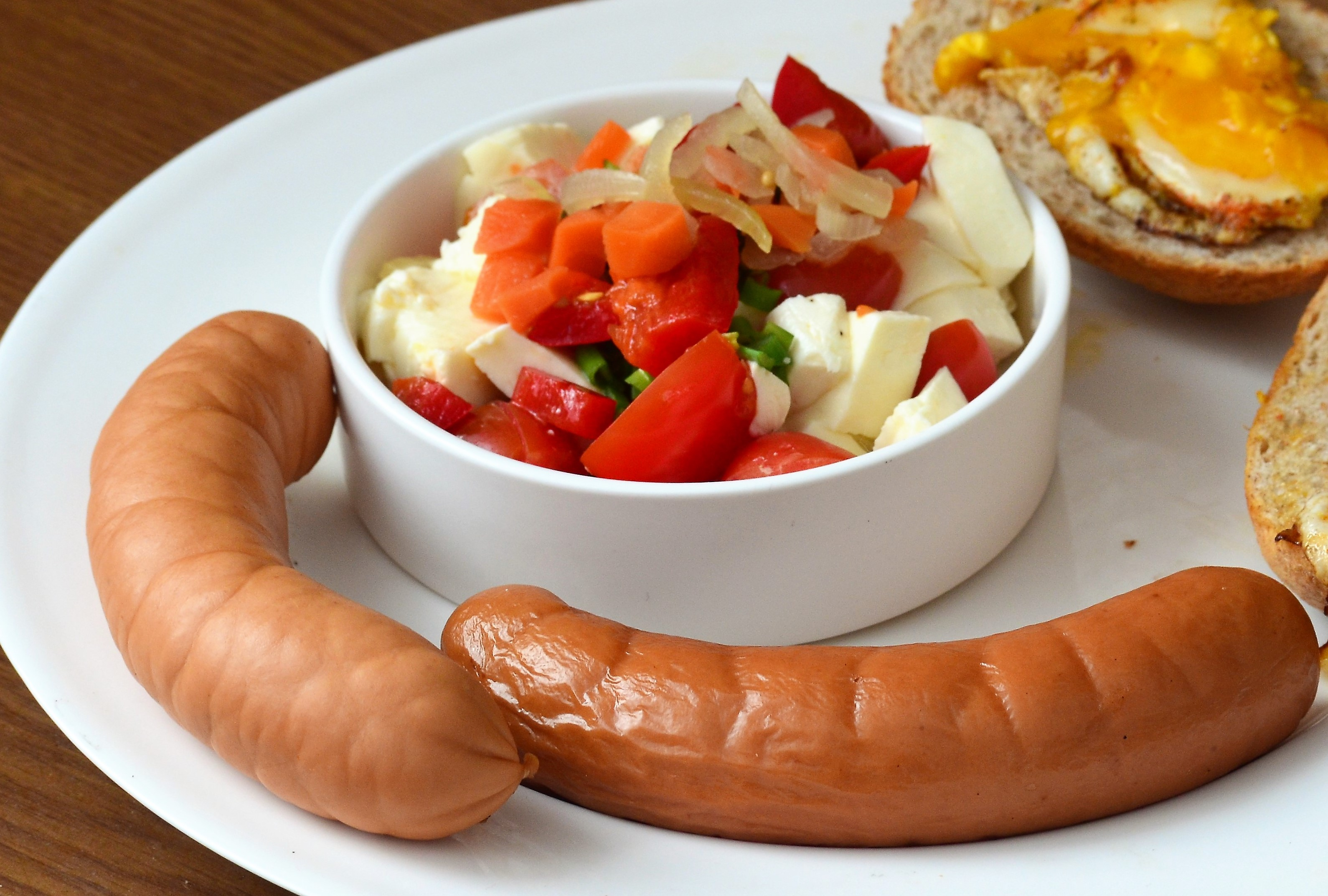
Sausages are a particularly dangerous food for choking, and may require being cut into small pieces.

Choking usually happens by swallowing mouthfuls that are too large or too abundant, and have been badly chewed. To reduce this risk, food is split into pieces of a moderate size, and chewed thoroughly before swallowing. Whenever a food can be chewed, it must be chewed, no matter whatever it is, even if it is very soft or gelatinous (such as creams, jellies and soft desserts).

The most dangerous foods for choking are the dry ones, the doughy ones, and the elongated ones. It is useful to have some liquid near, so it can be drunk and help to finish swallowing (before choking has happened and is already complete).

To swallow correctly, it is recommended that the neck be in a normal position, with the head looking forward, and being sitting down or standing up (not lying down or too reclined).

Distractions and being absent-minded increase the risk of choking, as when one laughs or does an activity at the same time. For this reason, eating while under the effects of sleep (not completely awake) also increases the possibilities of choking. The danger also increases in the case of being under the influence of alcohol, drugs or some medications that affect to perception or reaction capabilities. Eating in mouthfuls require some care.

=== Prevention for babies and children ===
All young children require care in eating, and they must learn to chew their food completely to avoid choking. Feeding them while they are running, playing, laughing, etc. increases the risk of choking. Caregivers must supervise children while eating or playing.

Pediatricians and dentists can provide information on various age groups to parents and caregivers about which food and toys are appropriate to prevent choking.

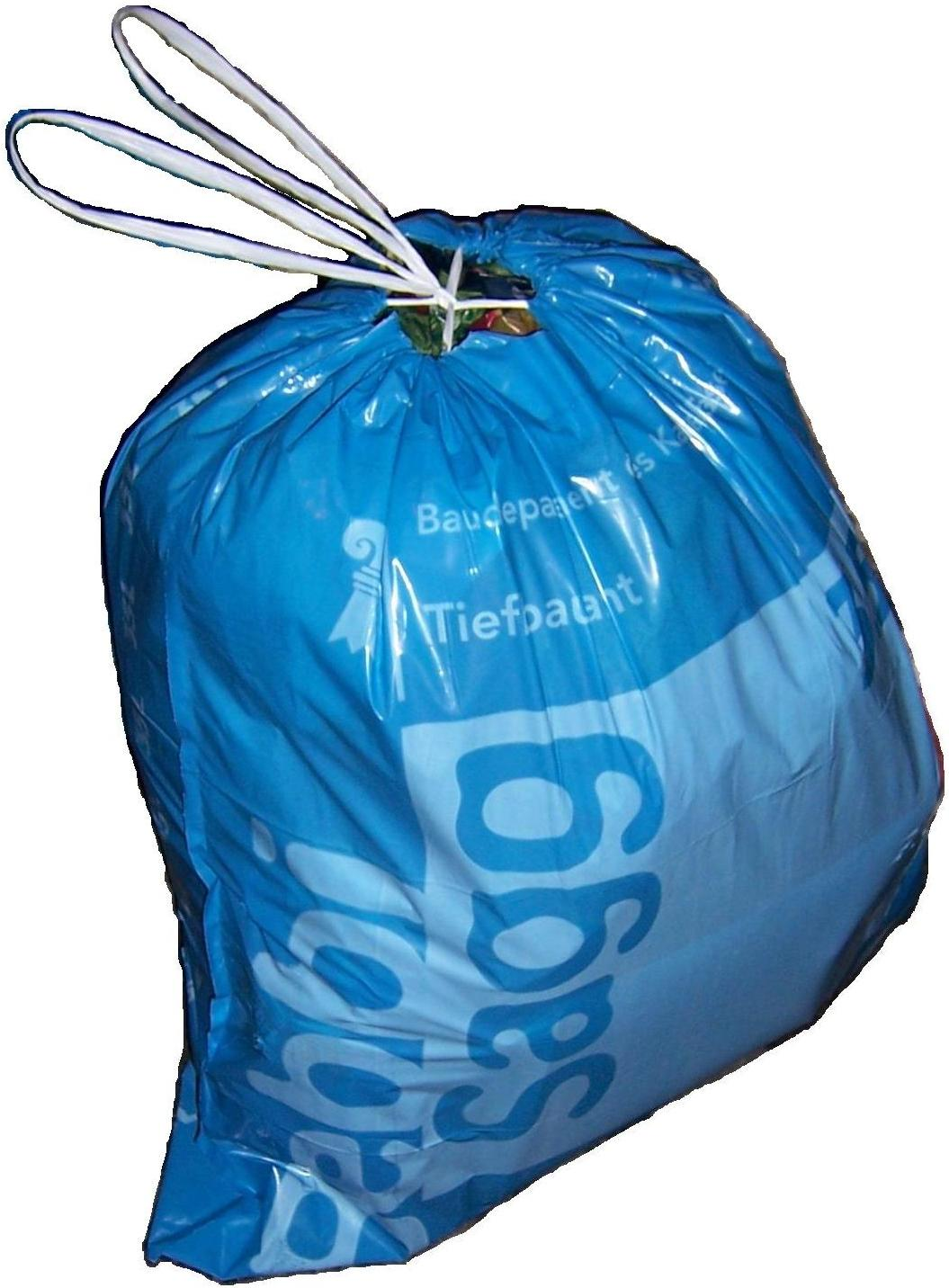
Little children can choke on any type of plastic bag or plastic balloon, as the bags for diapers

It is recommended waiting until 6 months of age before introducing solid foods to infants (according to the American Academy of Pediatricians). Caregivers should avoid giving children younger than 5 years-old foods that pose a high risk of choking, such as hot dog pieces, bananas, cheese sticks, cheese chunks, hard candy, nuts, grapes, marshmallows, or popcorn. Later, when they are accustomed to these foods, it is recommended to serve them split into small pieces. Some foods as hot dogs, bananas, or grapes are usually split lengthwise, sliced, or both (being the cut into slices the main part for safety in many long-shaped foods).

Children readily put small objects into their mouths (deflated balloons, marbles, small pieces, buttons, coins, button batteries, etc.), which can lead to choking. A complicated obstruction for babies is choking on deflated balloons (including preservatives) or plastic bags. This also includes the nappy sacks, used for wrapping the dirty diapers, which are sometimes dangerously placed near the babies. To prevent children from swallowing things, precautions should be taken in the environment to keep dangerous objects out of their reach. Small children must be supervised closely and taught to avoid putting things into their mouths. Toys and games may indicate on their packages the ages for which they are safe. In the US, children's toy and product manufacturers are required by law to apply appropriate warning labels to their packaging, but toys that are resold may not have them. Caregivers can try to prevent choking by considering the features of a toy (such as size, shape, consistency and small parts) before giving it to a child. Children's products that are found to pose a choking risk can be taken off the market.

Parents, teachers, and other caregivers for children are advised to be trained in choking first aid and cardiopulmonary resuscitation (CPR).

==== Anticipatory guidance from pediatricians ====
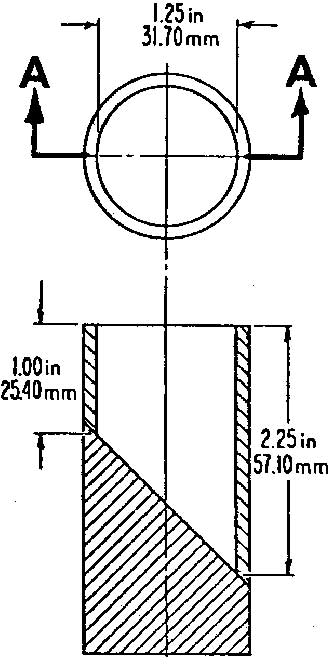
Small Parts Test Fixture (SPTF): used to determine whether toys and other products pose a choking hazard to children under 3 years old

As a part of well-visits, pediatricians provide education to parents and their children regarding their development. Included in these visits is anticipatory guidance, which provides advice to parents and children as primary prevention of disease and illness including choking. For example, for a child that is 7–9 months old, children start to develop a pincer grasp allowing them to reach for objects. The ability to place these objects in their mouths significantly increases choking risk.

Example anticipatory guidance for children 7–9 months old:

- Infants should avoid moving when feeding like riding in a car or stroller. Infants should be sitting upright and remain still.
- Infants should be supervised when feeding including children younger than 3 years old
- Infants will try to feed themselves. Avoid foods such as grapes, popcorn, carrots, nuts, and hard candies. Difficult to swallow foods like peanut butter and marshmallows should be given with caution.
- Specifically, toys like marbles, balls, balloons should not be given including children younger than 3 years old.

==== Regulations for children in the United States ====
Several laws and commissions are aimed at preventing choking hazards in children. Formed in 1972, alongside the passing of the Consumer Products Safety Act, the U.S. Consumer Product Safety Commission (CPSC) regulates consumer projects that may pose "unreasonable risk" of injury to its users. The Consumer Products Safety Act allowed the CPSC to ban or place warnings on objects that could harm consumers. A Small Parts Test Fixture (SPTF) is a cylinder measuring 2.25 inches long by 1.25 inches wide determines whether a choking hazarding warning will be placed on the product. Furthermore, in 2008, the Consumer Product Safety Improvement requires any advertisements or websites regarding sale of a product to display choking hazard warnings.

According to a 1991 study, warning labels are an effective preventive measure against choking accidents. Items that contain many parts may include pieces that are considered choking hazards. Labels on children's toys may state recommended age ranges, and other items may carry a warning to parents to keep them out of the reach of children. Warning labels are clearly placed and written, usually including an obvious image.

While products are protected, there are currently no Food and Drug Administration (FDA) regulations regarding food choking hazards.

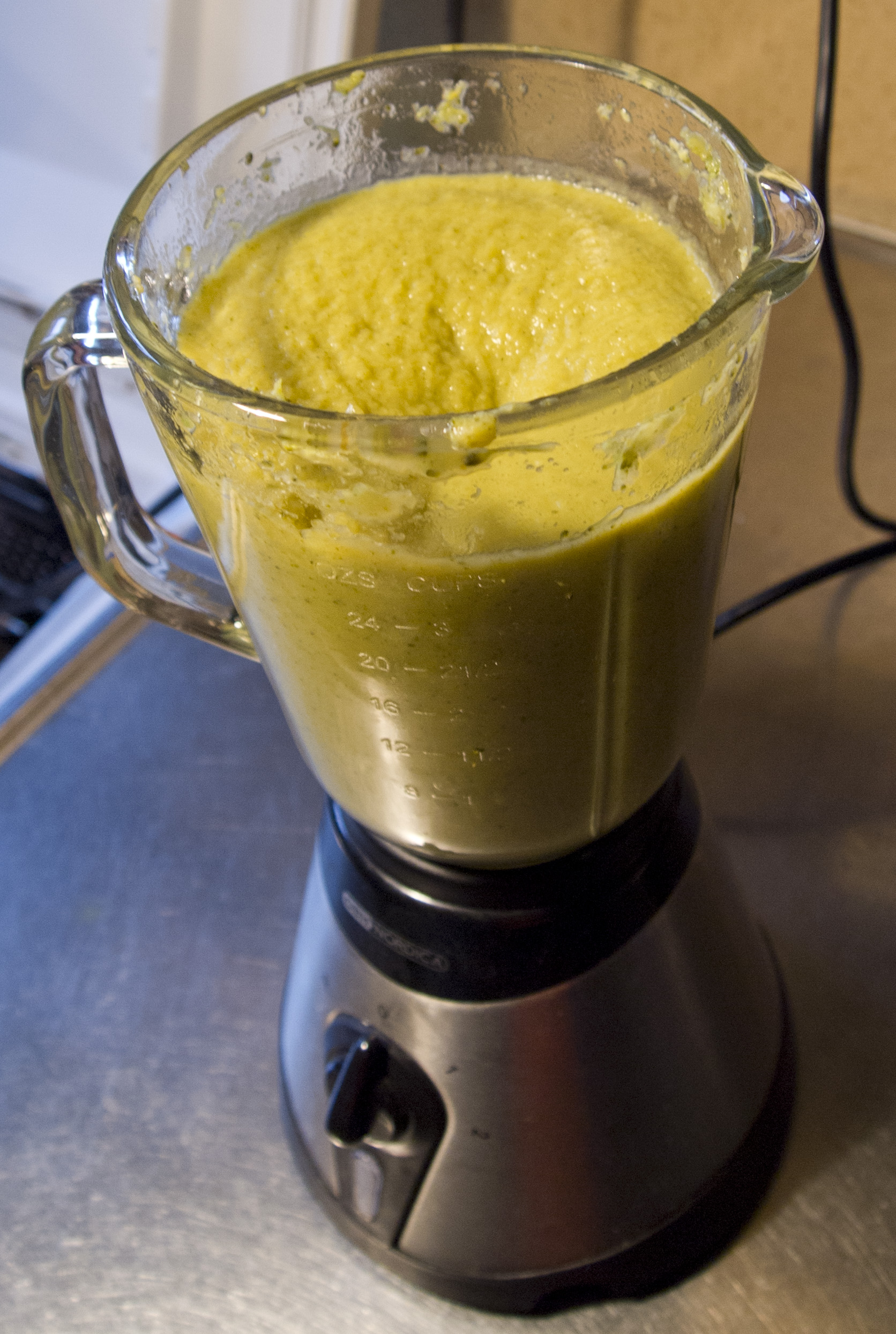
People in groups with high risk of choking may require mashed food

=== Prevention for other groups at risk ===
Some population groups have a higher risk of choking, such as the elderly, persons with disabilities (physically or mentally), people under the effects of alcohol or drugs, people who have taken medications that reduce the ability to salivate or react, patients with difficulties in swallowing (dysphagia), suicidal individuals, people with epilepsy, and people on the autism spectrum. They may require more assistance to feed themselves, and it may be necessary to supervise them while they eat.

As the ability to eat is deteriorating, some problematic foods (such as hot dogs, sausages, bananas, or grapes) can be split into slices and, additionally, lengthwise (being the cut into slices the main part for safety in many long-shaped foods). People who are unable to chew properly should not be served hard food. In cases where a person is unable to safely eat, food can be given by feeding syringes.

People who have taken any medication that reduces saliva should not eat solid food until their salivation is restored.

== See also ==
- Basic airway management
- BLS
- Breathing
- Cerebral hypoxia
- Oxygen deprivation
- Pulmonary aspiration
