= International Liaison Committee on Resuscitation =

- Abbreviation: ILCOR
- Formation: 1992; 34 years ago
- Fields: Resuscitation
- Co-Chair: Gavin Perkins
- Co-Chair: Robert Neumar
- Website: https://www.ilcor.org/

The International Liaison Committee on Resuscitation (ILCOR) was formed in 1992 to provide an opportunity for the major organizations in resuscitation to work together on CPR (Cardiopulmonary Resuscitation) and ECC (Emergency Cardiovascular Care) protocols. The name was chosen in 1996 to be a deliberate play on words relating to the treatment of sick hearts – "ill cor" (cor is Latin for heart).

ILCOR is composed of the American Heart Association (AHA), the European Resuscitation Council (ERC), the Heart and Stroke Foundation of Canada (HSFC), the Australian and New Zealand Committee on Resuscitation (ANZCOR), the Resuscitation Councils of Southern Africa (RCSA), the Resuscitation Councils of Asia (RCA), the Inter American Heart Foundation (IAHF), and the Indian Resuscitation Council Federation (IRCF)

== Mission statement ==
"To provide a consensus mechanism by which the international science and knowledge relevant to emergency cardiac care can be identified and reviewed. This consensus mechanism will be used to provide consistent international guidelines on emergency cardiac care for Basic Life Support (BLS), Paediatric Life Support (PLS) and Advanced Life Support (ALS). While the major focus will be upon treatment guidelines, the steering committee will also address the effectiveness of educational and training approaches and topics related to the organization and implementation of emergency cardiac care. The Committee will also encourage coordination of dates for guidelines development and conferences by various national resuscitation councils. These international guidelines will aim for a commonality supported by science for BLS, ALS and PLS."

== Objectives ==
The objectives of ILCOR are to:

- Provide a forum for discussion and for coordination of all aspects of cardiopulmonary and cerebral resuscitation worldwide.
- Foster scientific research in areas of resuscitation where there is a lack of data or where there is controversy.
- Provide for dissemination of information on training and education in resuscitation.
- Provide a mechanism for collecting, reviewing and sharing international scientific data on resuscitation.
- Produce as appropriate statements on specific issues related to resuscitation that reflect international consensus.

== Activities ==
ILCOR meets twice each year usually alternating between a venue in the United States and a venue elsewhere in the world. ILCOR produced the first International CPR Guidelines in 2000, and revised protocols in 2005 (published concurrently in the scientific journals Resuscitation and Circulation). A total of 281 experts completed 403 worksheets on 275 topics, reviewing more than 22000 published studies to produce the 2005 revision.

A further update appeared in 2015

The standard revisions cycle for resuscitation is five years. The next is therefore scheduled to be in 2025.
