= European Resuscitation Council =

- Abbreviation: ERC
- Formation: 1989; 37 years ago
- Type: Nonprofit organization
- Purpose: Education and training. Mission: To preserve human life by making high quality resuscitation available to all
- Headquarters: Niel, Belgium
- Parent organization: International Liaison Committee on Resuscitation
- Website: www.erc.edu

The European Resuscitation Council (ERC) is the European Interdisciplinary Council for Resuscitation Medicine and Emergency Medical Care. It was established in 1989.

The ERC is the network of National Resuscitation Councils in Europe.

The ERC is a member of the International Liaison Committee On Resuscitation (ILCOR), where ERC experts contribute actively to the worldwide Consensus On Science and Treatment Recommendations (CoSTR). The ERC also supports and initiates scientific studies related to resuscitation. Resuscitation is the official journal of the ERC.

The first chairman of the European Resuscitation Council (ERC) was Peter Baskett. A Board of 11 Directors sets the long-term plans of the organisation. Each Director holds additional specific responsibilities.

== Mission statement ==
The ERC's mission is To preserve human life by making high quality resuscitation available to all. Based on the CoSTR, the ERC publishes European Resuscitation Guidelines that are the standard for resuscitation practice and training in and beyond Europe.

== ERC courses ==
ERC medical courses are developed by world-leading experts in resuscitation:

- Basic Life Support (BLS).
- Immediate Life Support (ILS).
- Advanced Life Support (ALS).
- European Paediatric Basic Life Support (EPBLS).
- European Paediatric Immediate Life Support (EPILS).
- European Paediatric Advanced Life Support (EPALS).
- Newborn Life Support (NLS).
- Basic Life Support - Instructor (BLS-I).
- Generic Instructor Course (GIC).
- Educator Master Class (EMC).
- European Trauma Course (ETC).
