= Index of anatomy articles =

Articles related to anatomy include:

== A ==
- abdomen
- abdominal aorta
- abducens nerve
- abducens nucleus
- abducent
- abducent nerve
- abduction
- accessory bone
- accessory cuneate nucleus
- accessory nerve
- accessory olivary nucleus
- accommodation reflex
- acetabulum
- Achilles tendon
- acoustic nerve
- acromion
- adenohypophysis
- adenoids
- adipose
- aditus
- aditus ad antrum
- adrenal gland
- adrenergic
- afferent neuron
- agger nasi
- agnosia
- agonist
- alar ligament
- alimentary
- allantois
- allocortex
- alpha motor neurons
- alveolar artery
- alveolar process
- alveolus
- alveus of the hippocampus
- amatory anatomy
- amaurosis
- Ammon's horn
- ampulla
- Ampulla of Vater
- amygdala
- amygdalofugal pathway
- amygdaloid
- amylacea
- anaesthesia
- analgesia
- analogous
- anastomosis
- anatomical pathology
- anatomical position
- anatomical snuffbox
- anatomical terms of location
- anatomical terms of motion
- anatomy
- Anatomy of the human heart
- anconeus
- angiography
- angiology
- angular gyrus
- anhidrosis
- animal morphology
- anisocoria
- ankle
- ankle reflex
- annular ligament
- annulus of Zinn
- anomaly
- anomic aphasia
- anosognosia
- ansa cervicalis
- ansa lenticularis
- anterior cerebral artery
- Anterior chamber of eyeball
- anterior choroidal artery
- anterior commissure
- anterior communicating artery
- anterior corticospinal tract
- anterior cranial fossa
- anterior cruciate ligament
- anterior ethmoidal foramen
- anterior ethmoidal nerve
- anterior funiculus
- anterior horn cells
- anterior horn of the lateral ventricle
- anterior hypothalamus
- anterior inferior cerebellar artery
- anterior limb of the internal capsule
- anterior lobe of cerebellum
- anterior nucleus of the thalamus
- anterior perforated substance
- anterior pituitary
- anterior root
- anterior spinal artery
- anterior spinocerebellar tract
- anterior superior alveolar artery
- anterior tibial artery
- anterior vertebral muscle
- anterior white commissure
- anterolateral system
- antidromic
- antihelix
- anulus fibrosus
- anulus tendineus
- anus
- aorta
- aortic body
- aponeurosis
- apophysis
- appendage
- appendicular skeleton
- appendix
- aprosody
- aqueductal stenosis
- aqueous humor
- arachnoid
- arachnoid granulation
- arbor vitae
- archicerebellum
- archicortex
- archipallium
- archistriatum
- arcuate line
- arcuate nucleus
- area postrema
- areola
- arm
- arrectores pilorum
- arteria dorsalis pedis
- arterial arcades
- artery
- articular condyle of mandible
- articular disc
- articulation
- aryepiglotticus muscle
- arytenoid
- arytenoid cartilage
- arytenoideus muscle
- astereognosis
- asterion
- asterixis
- astrocyte
- asynergy
- ataxia
- atlanto-occipital joint
- atlas
- atresia
- atrioventricular node
- atrium
- auditory aphasia
- auditory cortex
- auditory meatus
- auditory ossicles
- auditory radiations
- auditory system
- auditory tube
- auricle
- auriculotemporal nerve
- auscultation
- autonomic
- autonomic ganglion
- axial skeleton
- axilla
- axillary artery
- axis
- axon
- axon hillock
- azygos

== B ==
- Babinski sign
- baculum
- ball and socket joint
- band of Baillarger
- Bartholin's gland
- basal cistern
- basal forebrain
- basal ganglia
- basalis nucleus of Meynert
- basal lamina
- basement membrane
- basilar artery
- basilar membrane
- basis pedunculi
- basket cell
- basolateral amygdala
- biceps
- bicipital aponeurosis
- bicuspid valve
- bifurcation
- bilateral symmetry
- bile duct
- biology
- bipolar cells of the retina
- bitemporal heminopia
- blastomere
- blood
- blood brain barrier
- body
- bone
- bone marrow
- bony labyrinth
- Bowman's capsule
- brachial artery
- brachial plexus
- brachiocephalic vein
- brachioradialis reflex
- brachium conjunctivum
- brachium of the inferior colliculus
- brachium of the superior colliculus
- brachium pontis
- brachium restiformis
- brain
- brain stem
- brainstem
- branchia
- branchiomeric musculature
- breast
- bregma
- bridging veins
- broad ligament of the uterus
- Broca's area
- bronchi
- bronchiole
- bronchus
- Broner
- Brunner's gland
- buccal fatpad
- buccal membrane
- buccal nerve
- buccinator
- bulbospongiosus
- bulbourethral gland
- bulbus
- bulla
- bundle of His
- bursa
- buttock

== C ==
- cafe-au-lait spots
- calamus scriptorius
- calcaneus
- calcar
- calcar avis
- calcar femorale
- calcarine fissure
- calcarine sulcus
- calf
- calix
- calyx
- canal of Schlemm
- canaliculus
- cancellous
- canine tooth
- canthus
- capillary
- capitate
- caput medusae
- carapace
- cardiac
- Cardiac skeleton
- cardiophrenic angle
- cardiovascular system
- carina
- carotid
- carotid bifurcation
- carotid body
- carotid canal
- carotid groove
- carotid plexus
- carotid sheath
- carotid sinus
- carotid siphon
- carpus
- cartilage
- caruncle
- catheter
- cauda
- cauda equina
- caudal
- caudate
- caudate nucleus
- cavernous sinus
- cavum tympani
- cavum subdurale
- cecum
- celiac
- celiac artery
- celiac ganglion
- celiac trunk
- celom
- central canal
- Central gelatinous substance of spinal cord
- central nucleus of inferior colliculus
- central retinal artery
- central sulcus
- central tegmental tract
- centromedian nucleus
- centrum semiovale
- cephalic
- cephalic vein
- cerebellar peduncle
- cerebellar projection
- cerebellar tonsil
- cerebellopontine angle
- cerebellothalamic tract
- cerebellum
- cerebral aqueduct
- cerebral arterial circle
- cerebral hemisphere
- cerebral peduncle
- cerebrospinal fluid
- cerebrum
- cerumen
- cervical
- cervical enlargement
- cervical fascia
- cervical plexus
- cervical spinal nerves
- cervical spine
- cervical vertebrae
- cervicothoracic ganglion
- cervix
- chaetae
- cheek
- chest
- Cheyne-Stokes respiration
- chiasma
- choanae
- chorda tympani
- Chorionic villi
- choroid
- choroid plexus
- chyle
- ciliary arteries
- ciliary body
- ciliary ganglion
- ciliary muscle
- ciliary nerves
- ciliospinal reflex
- cilium
- cingulate gyrus
- cingulum
- circle of Willis
- circulatory system
- circumflex artery
- cisterna
- cisterna chyli
- cisterna magna
- Clarke's column (dorsal nucleus)
- claustrum
- clava
- clavicle
- climbing fiber
- clitoris
- clivus
- cloaca
- clonus
- coccyx
- cochlea
- cochlear duct
- cochlear nerve
- coeliac
- coelom
- collar bone
- collateral eminence
- collateral fissure
- collateral trigone
- colliculus
- collum
- colon
- commissure
- common carotid artery
- common facial vein
- communicating veins
- comparative anatomy
- conchae
- condylar process of mandible
- condyle
- cone cell
- confluence of the sinuses
- conjoint tendon
- conjugate eye movement
- conjunctiva
- connective tissue
- conoid
- consensual reflex
- contralateral
- conus elasticus
- conus medullaris
- Coracobrachialis muscle coracoid
- coracoid process
- cordotomy
- cornea
- corneal reflex
- corniculate
- cornu
- corona radiata
- coronal plane
- coronal suture
- coronal view
- coronary
- coronary arteries
- coronary sinus
- coronoid
- coronoid process
- corpora quadrigemina
- corpus albicans
- corpus callosum
- corpus striatum
- corpuscle
- corrugator
- cortex
- corticobulbar axons
- corticomedial amygdala
- corticopontine fibers
- corticospinal tract
- corticostriate fiber
- costal cartilages
- costal margin
- costophrenic angle
- Cowper's gland
- coxae
- cranial
- cranial autonomic ganglia
- cranial bone
- cranial nerve ganglia
- cranial nerve nuclei
- cranial nerves
- cranium
- cremaster
- cribriform
- cribriform plate
- cricoarytenoid ligament
- cricoarytenoid muscle
- cricoid
- cricoid cartilage
- cricothyroid joint
- cricothyroid ligament
- cricothyroid muscle
- crista
- crista galli
- crossed extensor reflex
- cruciform ligament
- crus of cerebrum
- crus of clitoris
- crus of diaphragm
- crus of fornix
- crus of heart
- crus of penis
- crura of superficial inguinal ring
- cubital
- cuboid
- culmen
- cuneate
- cuneate fasciculus
- cuneate nucleus
- cuneate tubercle
- cuneiforms
- cuneocerebellar fibers
- cuneus
- cupula
- cusp
- cutaneous
- cyst
- cystic duct
- cystogram

== D ==
- dartos fascia
- DCML
- decerebrate response
- declive
- decomposition of movement
- decorticate response
- deep cerebellar nuclei
- deep lingual artery
- deglutition
- deltoid
- deltopectoral triangle
- demyelination
- dendrite
- dendritic spine
- dens
- dental alveolus
- dental caries
- dental formula
- dental pulp
- dentate gyrus
- dentate nucleus
- dentatothalamic tract
- denticulate ligament
- dentine
- dentition
- depressor anguli oris muscle
- dermatoglyphics
- dermatome
- dermis
- descendens cervicalis
- descending aorta
- descending duodenum
- detrusor
- deviated septum
- diagonal band
- diagonal band of Broca
- diaphragm
- diaphragma sellae
- diaphragmatic recess
- diaphysis
- diastole
- diencephalon
- digastric fossa
- digastric muscle
- digastric triangle
- digestive system
- diplopia
- diploë
- dislocation
- dissection
- distal
- diverticulum
- doll's eyes phenomenon
- dorsal
- dorsal cochlear nucleus
- dorsal column
- dorsal column nuclei
- dorsal funiculus
- dorsal horn
- dorsal root
- dorsal root ganglion
- dorsal spinocerebellar tract
- dorsal trigeminothalamic tract
- dorsolateral fasciculus
- dorsomedial nucleus of thalamus
- dorsum sellae
- dowager's hump
- ductless gland
- ductus
- ductus deferens
- duodenum
- dura mater
- dural septae
- dural venous sinus

== E ==
- ear
- eardrum
- ectopia (medicine)
- Edinger–Westphal nucleus
- efferent ducts
- efferent nerve fiber
- efferent limb
- ejaculatory duct
- elbow
- electrical conduction system of the heart
- emboliform nucleus
- embolus
- embryo
- embryonic yolk stalk
- emissary veins
- enamel
- encephalon
- encephalopathy
- endocardium
- endocranium
- endocrine gland
- endocrine system
- endoderm
- endolymph
- endometrium
- endoneurium
- endorphin
- endothelium
- enkephalin
- entorhinal cortex
- ependyma
- epicanthus
- epicardium
- epicondyle
- epicranial aponeurosis
- epidermis
- epididymis
- epidural hematoma
- epidural space
- epigastrium
- epiglottic cartilage
- epiglottis
- epimysium
- epineurium
- epiphyseal growth plates
- epiphysis
- epiploic foramen
- epithalamus
- epithelium
- epitympanic recess
- erector spinae
- esophageal plexus
- esophageal sphincter
- esophagus
- essential tremor
- ethmoid bone
- ethmoid sinus
- ethmoidal air cells
- ethmoidal bulla
- Europhiles
- Eustachian tube
- excretory system
- exocrine gland
- exophthalmos
- exoskeleton
- exotropia
- extensor posturing
- extensor retinaculum
- external auditory meatus
- external capsule
- external carotid artery
- external ear
- external iliac artery
- external jugular vein
- external laryngeal nerve
- external medullary lamina
- external nasal nerve
- external occipital protuberance
- external ophthalmoplegia
- extraocular muscles
- extraperitoneal
- extrapyramidal motor system
- extrapyramidal signs
- extrapyramidal system
- extreme capsule
- extrinsic muscle
- eye
- eyebrow
- eyelash
- eyelid

== F ==
- fabella
- face
- facet joint
- facial artery
- facial bone
- facial colliculus
- facial nerve
- facial nucleus
- facial vein
- falciform ligament
- fallopian tube
- false vocal cord
- falx cerebri
- fascia
- fascia lata
- fasciculation
- fasciculus lenticularis
- fastigial nucleus
- fastigium
- fat
- fauces
- femoral artery
- femoral neck
- femoral triangle
- femur
- fenestra
- fenestra cochleae
- fenestra ovalis
- fenestra vestibuli
- fetus
- fibre
- fibril
- fibrillation
- fibrous coat of the eye
- fibrous pericardium
- fibrous skeleton of the heart
- fibula
- fields of Forel
- filiform papillae
- filum
- filum terminale
- finger
- fingernail
- first thoracic ganglion
- fissure
- fistula
- flaccid paralysis
- flaccidity
- flank
- flexion
- flexor retinaculum
- floating ribs
- flocculonodular lobe
- flocculus
- fluent aphasia
- foetus
- fontanelle
- foot
- foramen
- foramen lacerum
- foramen magnum
- foramen of Luschka
- foramen of Magendie
- foramen of Monro
- foramen ovale (heart)
- foramen ovale (skull)
- foramen rotundum
- foramen spinosum
- forceps major
- forearm
- forebrain
- forehead
- foreskin
- formication
- fornix
- fossa
- Fourth trochanter
- fourth ventricle
- fovea
- foveola
- frenulum
- frenulum linguae
- frenum
- frontal air sinus
- frontal bone
- frontal eye field
- frontalis
- frontal horn of lateral ventricle
- frontal lobe
- frontal nerve
- frontal plane
- frontal pole
- frontal sinus
- frontonasal duct
- fundiform ligament
- fundus
- fungiform papillae
- funiculus
- furcula
- fusiform gyrus

== G ==
- gag reflex
- galea aponeurotica
- gall bladder
- gamma motoneurons
- ganglion
- ganglion cell
- ganglion cell of the retina
- gasserian ganglion
- gastrocnemius
- gastroduodenal artery
- gastroesophageal junction
- gastrohepatic ligament
- gastrointestinal tract
- gemellus
- geniculate ganglion
- geniculate nucleus
- geniculocalcarine tract
- geniculum
- genioglossus muscle
- geniohyoid muscle
- genitalia
- genu of corpus callosum
- genu of the internal capsule
- gill
- gingiva
- gizzard
- glabella
- gland (glandula)
- glans
- glenohumeral joint
- glenoid fossa
- glia
- globose nucleus
- globus pallidus
- glomerulus
- glossoepiglottic fold
- glossopharyngeal nerve
- glottis
- gluteus maximus
- gluteus medius
- gluteus minimus
- goiter
- Golgi apparatus
- gonad
- gracile fasciculus
- gracile nucleus
- gracile tubercle
- Gracilis muscle
- granular layer
- gravid
- gray matter
- Gray's Anatomy
- great cerebral vein
- great toe
- greater auricular nerve
- greater horn of the hyoid
- greater occipital nerve
- greater omentum
- greater palatine artery
- greater palatine canal
- greater palatine foramen
- greater palatine nerve
- greater petrosal nerve
- greater superficial petrosal nerve
- Greater trochanter
- greater wing of sphenoid
- groin
- gubernaculum
- gums
- gustatory
- gyrencephalic
- gyrus

== H ==
- habenula
- habenular nuclei
- haemorrhoid
- hair
- hair cells
- hair follicle
- hallux
- hamate
- hamstrings
- hamulus of hamate
- hand
- hard palate
- haustrum
- Haversian system
- head
- head of rib
- heart
- heel
- helicotrema
- helix
- hematoma
- hemiazygos vein
- hemiballismus
- hemidiaphragm
- hemiparesis
- hemisphere
- hemothorax
- hepatic
- hepatic artery
- hepatic flexure
- hepatic portal vein
- hepatic veins
- hepatoduodenal ligament
- hepatopancreatic ampulla hepatopancreatic sphincter
- hernia
- herniated disk
- hiatus
- hiatus semilunaris
- hilar vessels
- Hilton's law
- hilum
- hindbrain
- hip bone
- hippocampal formation
- hippocampal pyramidal cell
- hippocampal sulcus
- hippocampus
- histology
- history of anatomy
- Hoffmann's reflex
- homologous
- hormone
- horn
- human anatomical parts named after people
- human anatomy
- human body
- human skeleton
- humerus
- humours
- hunchback
- hyaline cartilage
- hymen
- hyoglossus muscle
- hyoid bone
- hypaxial muscles
- hypogastric artery
- hypogastric nerve
- hypoglossal canal
- hypoglossal nerve
- hypoglossal nucleus
- hypoglossal trigone
- hypopharynx
- hypophyseal artery
- hypophyseal fossa
- hypophyseal portal system
- hypophysis
- hypophysis cerebri
- hypothalamic sulcus
- hypothalamohypophyseal portal system
- hypothalamohypophyseal tract
- hypothalamospinal tract
- hypothalamotegmental tract
- hypothalamus
- hypothalmotegmental axon
- hypothenar muscles

== I ==
- ileal vessels
- ileocecal valve
- ileocolic artery
- ileum
- iliac crest
- iliac lymph nodes
- iliac region
- iliac spine
- iliacus muscle
- iliolumbar artery
- iliopsoas muscle
- iliotibial band
- ilium
- immune system
- incisive canal
- incisive fossa
- incisor
- incisura
- incus
- index finger
- indusium griseum
- infarction
- inferior alveolar artery
- inferior alveolar nerve
- inferior cerebellar peduncle
- inferior cervical sympathetic ganglion
- inferior colliculus
- inferior concha
- inferior frontal gyrus
- inferior gluteal artery
- inferior horn
- inferior meatus
- inferior mesenteric artery
- inferior mesenteric vein
- inferior nasal concha
- inferior oblique muscle
- inferior olivary nucleus
- inferior orbital fissure
- inferior petrosal sinus
- inferior pharyngeal constrictor muscle
- inferior pubic ramus
- inferior rectus muscle
- inferior sagittal sinus
- inferior salivatory nucleus
- inferior temporal gyrus
- inferior thyroid artery
- inferior thyroid vein
- Inferior tibiofibular joint
- inferior vena cava
- inferior vestibular nucleus
- infraglottic cavity
- infrahyoid strap muscles
- infraorbital canal
- infraorbital foramen
- infraorbital groove
- infraorbital nerve
- infraspinatus muscle
- infratemporal fossa
- infratentorial
- infundibular nucleus
- infundibulum
- inguinal
- inguinal canal
- inguinal ligament
- inguinal lymph nodes
- inguinal triangle
- inner table of skull
- innervate
- innominate
- insula
- integument
- integumentary system
- interatrial septum
- intercalated disc
- intercondylar eminences
- intercostal muscles
- interdigitation
- interhemispheric fissure
- intermediate horn cell
- intermediolateral cell column
- intermediolateral nucleus
- internal acoustic meatus
- internal arcuate fiber
- internal capsule
- internal carotid artery
- internal cerebral vein
- internal ear
- internal iliac artery
- internal iliac vein
- internal jugular vein
- internal laryngeal nerve
- internal medullary lamina
- internal oblique muscle
- internal thoracic artery
- internal thoracic veins
- interneuron
- interosseus membrane
- interpeduncular cistern
- interpeduncular fossa
- Interstitial cell
- Interstitial cell tumor
- Interstitial collagenase
- Interstitial cystitis
- Interstitial fluid
- Interstitial granulomatous dermatitis
- Interstitial infusion
- Interstitial keratitis
- Interstitial lung disease
- Interstitial nephritis
- Interstitial pregnancy
- Interstitium
- interthalamic adhesion
- intertrochanteric line
- interventricular foramen of Monro
- interventricular septum
- intervertebral disc
- Intestinal villus
- intestine
- intrafusal
- intrafusal muscle fibers
- intralaminar thalamic nuclei
- intramedullary
- intravenous
- intrinsic muscles of the tongue
- introitus
- ipsilateral
- iris
- iris dilator muscle
- iris sphincter muscle
- ischemia
- ischial spine
- ischial tuberosity
- ischiorectal fossa
- ischium
- Islets of Langerhans
- isthmus

== J ==
- Jacksonian seizure
- jaw
- jejunum
- joint
- joint capsule
- joint space
- jugular
- jugular foramen
- jugular notch
- jugum
- juxtaglomerular apparatus

== K ==
- keel
- keloid
- keratin
- kidney
- kinesthesia
- kinocilium
- knee
- knee jerk reflex
- kneecap
- knuckle
- kyphosis

== L ==
- labia majora
- labia minora
- labium
- labrum
- labyrinth
- lacrimal bone
- lacrimal canaliculus
- lacrimal fossa
- lacrimal gland
- lacrimal nerve
- lacrimal papilla
- lacrimal punctum
- lacrimal sac
- lactation
- lacteal
- lactiferous duct
- lacuna
- lacunae laterales
- lacus lacrimalis
- lambdoid suture
- lamella
- lamina
- lamina papyracea
- lamina terminalis
- laminectomy
- language center
- lanugo
- large intestine
- laryngeal inlet
- laryngopharynx
- larynx
- lateral aperture
- lateral cervical muscle
- lateral corticospinal tract
- lateral cricoarytenoid muscle
- lateral cuneate nucleus
- lateral dorsal nucleus of thalamus
- lateral fissure
- lateral funiculus
- lateral geniculate body or nucleus
- lateral horn
- lateral hypothalamus
- lateral lemniscus
- lateral olfactory stria
- lateral posterior nucleus
- lateral pterygoid muscle
- lateral pterygoid plate
- lateral recess (of the fourth ventricle)
- lateral rectus muscle
- lateral sclerosis
- lateral semicircular canal
- lateral spinothalamic tract
- lateral striate arteries
- lateral thalamic nucleus
- lateral ventricles
- lateral vertebral muscle
- lateral vestibular nucleus
- lateral vestibulospinal tract
- latissimus dorsi
- Laurer's canal
- left atrium
- left colic artery
- left common carotid artery
- left gastroepiploic artery
- left mainstem bronchi
- left marginal artery
- left pulmonary artery
- left ventricle
- leg
- lemniscus
- lens
- lenticular nucleus
- lenticulostriate artery
- lentiform
- lentiform nucleus
- leptomeninx
- lesser occipital nerve
- lesser omentum
- lesser palatine foramen
- lesser petrosal nerve
- Lesser trochanter
- lesser wing of sphenoid
- levator muscle
- levator labii superioris muscle
- levator palpebrae muscle
- levator palpebrae superioris
- levator scapulae muscle
- levator velum palatini muscle
- ligament
- ligament of Treitz
- ligamentum arteriosum
- ligamentum flavum
- ligamentum teres
- light reflex
- limbic system
- limen insulae
- line of Gennari
- linea alba
- linea aspera
- lingua
- lingual artery
- lingual nerve
- lingual tonsil
- lingual vein
- lingula
- lip
- lipofuscin
- Lissauer's tract
- list of human anatomical features
- Little's area
- liver
- lobule
- locus coeruleus
- loin
- long bone
- long ciliary nerves
- longitudinal fissure
- longus capitis muscle
- longus colli muscle
- love handles
- lower motor neuron
- lumbar
- lumbar artery
- lumbar enlargement
- lumbar spine
- lumbar vertebrae
- lumbosacral enlargement
- lumbosacral plexus
- lumbrical
- lunate
- lung
- lymph
- lymph nodes
- lymphatic system
- lymphatic vessels

== M ==
- macroscopic
- macula
- macular sparing
- magnocellular nuclei
- main pulmonary artery
- major duodenal papilla
- malleolus
- malleus
- Malpighian layer
- mammae
- mammary gland
- mammilla
- mammillary bodies
- mammillothalamic tract
- mammogram
- mandible
- mandibular condyles
- mandibular foramen
- mandibular fossa
- mandibular nerve
- mandibular notch
- manubrium
- massa intermedia
- masseter muscle
- masseteric vessels
- mastication
- mastoid air cells
- mastoid process
- matrix
- maxilla
- maxillae
- maxillary antrum
- maxillary artery
- maxillary nerve
- maxillary sinus
- meconium
- medial forebrain bundle
- medial geniculate body
- medial geniculate nucleus or body
- medial lemniscus
- medial longitudinal fasciculus
- medial meniscus
- medial olfactory stria
- medial pterygoid plate
- medial rectus muscle
- medial vestibular nucleus
- medial vestibulospinal tract
- median aperture
- median eminence
- median neuropathy
- mediastinum
- medulla oblongata
- medullary cavity
- Meissner's corpuscle
- membrane
- membranous labyrinth
- meninges
- meningiomas
- meniscus (anatomy)
- mental foramen
- mental nerve
- mentalis muscle
- mentum
- mesencephalic reticular formation
- mesencephalon
- midbrain
- mesenchyme
- mesentery
- mesoderm
- mesosalpinx
- metacarpus
- metaphysis
- metastatic lesion
- metatarsals
- metatarsus
- metathalamus
- metencephalon
- metopic
- Meyer's loop
- microglia
- micturition
- midbrain
- middle cerebellar peduncle
- middle cerebral artery
- middle cervical sympathetic ganglion
- middle colic artery
- middle concha
- middle cranial fossa
- middle ear
- middle ear bone complex
- middle meatus
- middle meningeal artery
- middle meningeal vein
- middle pharyngeal constrictor muscle
- middle sacral artery
- middle superior alveolar artery
- middle temporal gyrus
- midline nuclei
- miosis
- mitral cell
- modiolus
- molar
- monaminergic neurons
- mononeuropathy multiplex
- mons pubis
- moro reflex
- morphology
- morula
- motor aphasia
- motor cortex
- motor endplate
- motor neuron
- motor unit
- mouth
- mucoperiosteum
- mucosa
- mucous membranes
- multifidus
- muscle
- muscle fascicle
- muscle spindle
- muscle tissue
- muscles of the thorax
- muscular atrophy
- muscular system
- muscular triangle
- mydriasis
- myelencephalon
- myelin
- myelogram
- myelomeningocele
- myelopathy
- mylohyoid
- mylohyoid groove
- mylohyoid line
- mylohyoid muscle
- mylohyoid nerve
- myocardium
- myocyte
- myology
- myotome
- myotonia
- myotonic dystrophy

== N ==
- nape
- naris
- nasal bone
- nasal choanae
- nasal concha
- nasal septum
- nasal turbinates
- nasion
- nasociliary nerve
- nasolacrimal canal
- nasolacrimal duct
- nasopalatine nerve
- nasopharynx
- natal
- navicular
- neck
- neocerebellum
- neocortex
- neonatal
- neopallium
- neospinothalamic axon
- neostriatum
- nephron
- nerve of the pterygoid canal
- nerve
- nerve fascicle
- nervi erigentes
- nervous system
- neural crest cell
- neural foramen
- neural groove
- neural tube defect
- neural tube
- neural
- neuroectoderm
- neuroglia
- neurohypophysis
- neurolemma
- neurology
- neuromuscular junction
- neuron
- neuropil
- nevus
- nictitating membrane
- nigrostriatal axon
- nipple
- Nissl body
- nociception
- nodes of Ranvier
- nodose ganglion
- nodule
- nose
- nostril
- nares
- notochord
- nuchal ligament
- nucleus
- nucleus accumbens
- nucleus ambiguus
- nucleus fastigius
- nucleus of Luys
- nucleus pulposus
- nucleus solitarius
- nystagmus, pathologic
- nystagmus, physiologic

== O ==
- obex
- oblique muscles
- obturator canal
- obturator externus muscle
- obturator foramen
- obturator internus muscle
- occipital artery
- occipital bone
- occipital horn
- occipital lobe
- occipitalis muscle
- occiput
- occlusion
- oculocephalic reflex
- oculomotor
- oculomotor complex
- oculomotor nerve
- oculomotor nucleus
- oculus
- odontoid process
- oesophagus
- olecranon process
- olfaction
- olfactory association cortex
- olfactory bulb
- olfactory cortex
- olfactory epithelium
- olfactory mucosa
- olfactory nerve
- olfactory striae
- olfactory system
- olfactory tract
- olfactory trigone
- oligodendroglia
- oligodendroglial cells
- olive
- olivocerebellar axon
- olivopontocerebellar degeneration
- omental bursa
- omentum
- omohyoid
- omohyoid fascia
- omohyoid muscle
- ontogeny
- operculum
- ophthalmology
- ophthalmic artery
- optic canal
- optic chiasm
- optic disc
- optic foramen
- optic nerve
- optic papilla
- optic radiation
- optic recess
- optic tract
- ora serrata
- oral cavity
- orbicularis oculi muscle
- orbicularis oris muscle
- orbit
- orbitofrontal cortex
- organ
- organ of Corti
- organelle
- orifice
- oropharynx
- os clitoridis
- os multangulum minus
- ossicles
- ossification
- osteology
- osteon
- ostium
- otic ganglion
- otolith
- outer table of skull
- oval window
- ovarian follicle
- ovary
- ovum

== P ==
- pachymeninx
- pacinian corpuscle
- palate
- palatine bone
- palatine glands
- palatine process
- palatine tonsils
- palatoglossal arch
- palatoglossus muscle
- palatopharyngeal arch
- palatopharyngeus muscle
- paleocerebellum
- paleopallium
- paleospinothalamic axon
- paleostriatum
- pallidothalamic fiber
- palmar aponeurosis
- palmomental reflex
- palpation
- palpebral commissures
- pampiniform plexus
- pancreas
- pancreatic duct
- panniculus
- papilla
- papillary muscles
- paraaortic lymph nodes
- paracentral lobule
- paracolic gutters
- paradidymis
- paraesthesia
- parafascicular nucleus
- parahippocampal gyrus
- parallel fibers
- paralysis
- paramedian pontine reticular formation
- parametrium
- paraphasia
- parasagittal
- parasympathetic
- paraterminal gyrus
- parathyroid glands
- paraventricular nucleus
- parenchyma
- paresis
- paresthesia
- parietal bones
- parietal cell
- parietal lobe
- parotid duct
- parotid gland
- parturition
- parotid papilla
- parotid sheath
- pars flaccida
- pars opercularis
- pars tensa
- parvicellular neurosecretory nuclei
- patella
- patellar reflex
- pecten pubis
- pectinate
- pectineal
- pectineus
- pectoral
- pectoral girdle
- pectoralis
- pectoralis major
- pectoralis minor
- pedicle
- peduncle
- pelvic diaphragm
- pelvic floor
- pelvic inlet
- pelvic outlet
- pelvis
- penis
- pennate
- periamygdaloid area
- periamygdaloid cortex
- perianal
- periaqueductal gray
- pericardium
- perichondrium
- pericranium
- perikaryon
- perilymph
- perineum
- perineurium
- periodontal ligament
- periosteum
- peripheral
- peripheral nervous system
- perirhinal cortex
- peristalsis
- peritoneal cavity
- peritoneum
- periventricular nucleus
- peroneal artery
- Persistent truncus arteriosus
- pes anserinus
- pes hippocampi
- petrous bone
- petrous pyramid
- Peyer's patches
- phalanges
- phalanges of the foot
- phalanges of the hand
- phallus
- pharyngeal constrictor muscles
- pharyngeal plexus
- pharyngeal recess
- pharyngeal tonsil
- pharyngobasilar fascia
- pharyngotympanic tube
- pharynx
- philtrum
- phonation
- photoreceptors
- phrenic nerve
- phylogeny
- pia mater
- pillar of fauces
- pilomotor
- pilus
- pineal body
- pineal gland
- pinna
- piriformis
- piriform sinus
- pisiform
- pituitary gland
- placenta
- plantar aponeurosis
- platysma muscle
- pleura
- plexus
- plica semilunaris
- pollex
- pollicis
- pollux
- pons
- pontine nuclei
- popliteal artery
- popliteal bursa
- popliteal fossa
- popliteal vein
- popliteus
- portal vein
- postcentral gyrus
- posterior atlantooccipital membrane
- posterior auricular artery
- posterior cerebral artery
- Posterior chamber of eyeball
- posterior clinoid
- posterior commissure
- posterior communicating artery
- posterior cranial fossa
- posterior cricoarytenoid muscle
- posterior cruciate ligament
- posterior funiculus
- posterior hypothalamus
- posterior inferior cerebellar artery
- posterior lobe of the cerebellum
- posterior nasal artery
- posterior septal artery
- posterior spinal arteries
- posterior spinocerebellar tract
- posterior superior alveolar artery
- posterior tibial artery
- posterior triangle of the neck
- Postganglionic neuron
- posture
- precentral gyrus
- precuneus
- prefrontal cortex
- preganglionic
- preganglionic neurons
- premolar
- premotor cortex
- preoccipital notch
- preoptic recess
- preoptic region
- prepuce
- prepyriform cortex
- presacral space
- prevertebral fascia
- primary fissure
- primary olfactory cortex
- primary sensory neuron
- primary somatosensory cortex
- proboscis
- procerus
- process
- processus
- profunda femoris artery
- projection fibers
- promontory
- pronate
- prone
- proprioception
- proprioceptive
- prosection
- prosector
- prosencephalon
- forebrain
- prosopagnosia
- prostate
- prostatic urethra
- protract
- protuberance
- proximal
- psoas muscle
- pterion
- pterygoid plate
- pterygoid process
- pterygomandibular ligament
- pterygopalatine foramen
- pterygopalatine fossa
- pterygopalatine ganglion
- ptosis
- puberty
- pubic hair
- pubic symphysis
- pubis
- pudendal nerve
- pulmonary
- pulmonary alveolus
- pulmonary trunk
- pulmonary vein
- pulp
- pulvinar
- punctum
- pupil
- pupillary dilatation
- pupillary light reflex
- purkinje cells
- putamen
- pyloric antrum
- pyloric valve
- pylorus
- pyramid
- pyramidal cell
- pyramidal system
- pyramidal tract
- pyriform cortex
- pyriform lobe

== Q ==
- quadrangular membrane
- quadrangular space
- quadrate
- quadratojugal
- quadriceps
- quadrigeminal body
- quadrigeminal plate
- quadrigeminus
- quadriplegia

== R ==
- radial artery
- radius
- radula
- rami communicantes
- ramus
- raphe
- raphe nuclei
- receptor layer of retina
- rectum
- rectus abdominis muscle
- rectus capitis anterior muscle
- rectus capitis lateralis muscle
- rectus femoris muscle
- rectus sheath
- recurrent laryngeal nerve
- red nucleus
- reflex
- Reissner's membrane
- Reissner's fibre
- renal artery
- renal capsule
- renal cortex
- renal hilus
- renal pyramids
- renal system
- reproductive system
- respiratory system
- restiform body
- rete
- rete testis
- reticular formation
- reticular nucleus of thalamus
- reticulospinal tract
- reticulum (anatomy)
- retina
- retinaculum
- retinal artery
- retinotopic
- retrobulbar neuritis
- retromandibular vein
- Retromolar space
- retroperitoneal
- retropharyngeal space
- retroversion
- retrovisceral space
- Rexed's laminae
- rhinencephalon
- rhombencephalon
- rhomboid fossa
- rib
- right atrium
- right colic artery
- right common carotid artery
- right gastroepiploic artery
- right mainstem bronchi
- right marginal artery
- right pulmonary artery
- right ventricle
- rima glottidis
- risorius
- rod cells
- rostrum of corpus callosum
- rotator cuff
- round ligament of the uterus
- round window
- rubrospinal tract
- rugae

== S ==
- saccade
- saccule
- sacral ala
- sacral vertebrae
- sacral promontory
- sacroiliac joint
- sacrum
- sagittal crest
- sagittal suture
- saliva
- salivary gland
- salpinx
- saphenous vein
- sartorius
- satellite cells
- scala media
- scala tympani
- scala vestibuli
- scalp
- scaphoid
- scaphoid fossa
- scapula
- scar
- Schwann cell
- sciatic nerve
- sclera
- scleral venous sinus
- sclerotome
- scoliosis
- scotoma
- scrotum
- scutum
- sebaceous glands
- secondary oocyte
- secretion
- sella turcica
- semen
- semicircular canal
- semimembranosus
- seminal vesicles
- seminiferous tubules
- semitendinosus
- sensorimotor cortex
- sensory decussation
- sensory system
- septal cartilage
- septal nuclei
- septal vein
- septum
- septum pellucidum
- septum primum
- septum secundum
- serous
- serous membrane
- serous pericardium
- sesamoid bone
- sex organ
- Sharpey's fibres
- short ciliary nerves
- shoulder
- shoulder blade
- shin
- sight
- sigmoid colon
- sigmoid sinus
- Simian crease
- simian shelf
- sinoatrial node
- sinus
- skeletal system
- skeleton
- Skene's gland
- skin
- skull
- small intestine
- smegma
- soft palate
- sole (foot)
- soleus
- solitary nucleus
- solitary tract
- somatic
- somite
- spasm
- spasticity
- spermatheca
- spermatic cord
- sphenoethmoidal recess
- sphenoid bone
- sphenoidal sinus
- sphenopalatine artery
- sphenopalatine foramen
- sphincter
- spicule (nematode)
- spicule (sponge)
- spina bifida
- spinal accessory nucleus
- spinal cord
- spinal lemniscus
- spinal nerve
- spine
- spine of the scapula
- spinocerebellar tract
- spinocerebellum
- spinocervical pathway
- spinothalamic tract
- spinous process
- spiral ganglion
- splanchnic nerves
- spleen
- splenic artery
- splenic flexure
- splenic vein
- splenium of the corpus callosum
- splenius capitis muscle
- squamous
- stapedius
- stapes
- stellate cell
- stellate ganglion
- stereocilia
- stereognosis
- sternoclavicular articulation
- sternocleidomastoid muscle
- sternohyoid muscle
- sternothyroid muscle
- sternum
- stoma
- stomach
- straight sinus
- strap muscles
- Stratum lucidum
- stratum zonale
- stretch reflex
- striae gravidarum
- stria medullaris thalami
- stria terminalis
- striate cortex
- striate nucleus
- striatum
- stroma
- stylet
- styloglossus muscle
- stylohyoid muscle
- styloid process
- stylopharyngeus muscle
- subarachnoid cisternae
- subarachnoid space
- subcallosal gyrus
- subclavian artery
- subclavian vein
- subdural hematoma
- subdural space
- subglottic airway
- subiculum
- sublingual fossa
- sublingual region
- sublingual salivary gland
- subluxation
- submandibular duct
- submandibular ganglion
- submandibular gland
- submandibular triangle
- submental triangle
- suboccipital muscle
- suboccipital triangle
- subscapularis muscle
- Substantia gelatinosa of Rolando
- substantia innominata
- substantia nigra
- subthalamic nucleus
- sulcus
- sulcus limitans
- superciliary arch
- superficial muscular aponeurotic system
- superficial temporal artery
- superior alveolar artery
- superior cerebellar artery
- superior cerebellar peduncle
- superior cervical ganglion
- superior colliculus
- superior concha
- superior gluteal artery
- superior jugular bulb
- superior laryngeal artery
- superior laryngeal nerve
- superior meatus
- superior mesenteric artery
- superior mesenteric vein
- superior oblique muscle
- superior olivary nucleus
- superior ophthalmic vein
- superior orbital fissure
- superior petrosal sinus
- superior pharyngeal constrictor muscle
- superior pubic ramus
- superior rectus
- superior rectus muscle
- superior sagittal sinus
- superior salivatory nucleus
- superior temporal gyrus
- superior thyroid artery
- superior thyroid vein
- Superior tibiofibular joint
- superior vena cava
- superior vesicle artery
- superior vestibular nucleus
- supplementary motor cortex
- suprachiasmatic cistern
- supraclavicular nerves
- supramarginal gyrus
- supraoptic nucleus
- supraorbital artery
- supraorbital foramen
- supraorbital nerve
- suprapatellar bursa
- sural nerve
- suspensory ligament
- sustentaculum tali
- suture
- sweat glands
- sylvian fissure
- sympathetic chain ganglion
- sympathetic nerve
- sympathetic nervous system
- sympathetic trunk
- symphysis
- synapse
- synaptic bouton
- syncytium
- syndesmosis
- synovial fluid
- synovial joint
- systole

== T ==
- tabes dorsalis
- taenia coli
- tail of pancreas
- talus
- tapetum lucidum
- tarsus
- taste buds
- taste pore
- Tectorial membrane (cochlea)
- Tectorial membrane of atlanto-axial joint
- tectospinal tract
- tectum
- tegmen tympani
- tegmentum
- tela choroidae
- telencephalon
- temporal artery
- temporal bone
- temporal fascia
- temporal gyrus
- temporal lobe
- temporal pole
- temporalis muscle
- temporomandibular joint
- tendon
- tensor tympani muscle
- tensor veli palatini
- tentorial incisure
- tentorial notch
- tentorium cerebelli
- Terminal sulcus (heart)
- Terminal sulcus of tongue
- terminal vein
- testicle
- thalamic fasciculus
- thalamogeniculate artery
- thalamotomy
- thalamus
- thenar eminence
- thigh
- thigh bone
- Third trochanter
- third ventricle
- thoracic aorta
- thoracic cavity
- thoracic duct
- thoracic spine
- thoracic vertebrae
- thorax
- thrombus
- thymus
- thyroarytenoid muscle
- thyrocervical trunk
- thyroepiglotticus muscle
- thyroglossal duct
- thyrohyoid membrane
- thyrohyoid muscle
- thyroid
- thyroid cartilage
- thyroid gland
- tibia
- tibial tuberosity
- toe
- tomogram
- tongue
- tonsil
- tonsil of cerebellum
- tooth
- torcular herophili
- torso
- torticollis
- torus
- trabecula
- trabecular meshwork
- trachea
- tract of Lissauer
- tractus solitarius
- tragus
- transverse cervical artery
- transverse cervical nerve
- transverse colon
- transverse facial artery
- transverse pericardial sinus
- transverse process
- transverse sinus
- transversus abdominis muscle
- trapezium
- trapezius
- trapezoid
- trapezoid body
- triangle of auscultation
- triangles of the neck
- triceps
- triceps reflex
- tricuspid valve
- trigeminal ganglion
- trigeminal lemniscus
- trigeminal nerve
- Trigone of urinary bladder
- triquetral
- triticeal cartilage
- Trochlea of humerus
- Trochlea of superior oblique
- trochlear nerve
- trochlear nucleus
- Trochlear process
- true vocal cords
- Truncus arteriosus (embryology)
- tuber cinereum
- tuberal nuclei
- tuberal region of hypothalamus
- tubercle
- tubercle of rib
- tuberculum impar
- tuberoinfundibular tract
- tuberosity
- tunica vaginalis testis
- turbinate
- turbinate bone
- tympanic cavity
- tympanic membrane
- tympanic plexus
- tympanum

== U ==
- ulna
- ulnar artery
- ulnar nerve
- umbilical folds
- umbilicus
- umbo
- uncal cortex
- uncal herniation
- Uncinate process of ethmoid bone
- Uncinate process of pancreas
- Uncinate process of vertebra
- Uncinate processes of ribs
- upper motor neuron
- urachus
- ureter
- urethra
- urinary bladder
- urinary meatus
- urogenital system
- uterine cavity
- uterine tube
- uterus
- utricle
- uvea
- uvula

== V ==
- vagina
- vagus ganglia
- vagus nerve
- vallate papillae
- vallecula
- Valsalva maneuver
- varicocele
- varus deformity
- vasa recta
- vascular system
- vein
- velum
- velum interpositum
- vena terminalis
- venogram
- venter
- ventral amygdalofugal pathway
- ventral anterior thalamic nucleus
- ventral cochlear nucleus
- ventral corticospinal tract
- ventral horn cell
- ventral lateral nucleus of thalamus
- ventral posterolateral nucleus
- ventral posterolateral thalamus
- ventral posteromedial nucleus
- ventral root
- ventral spinocerebellar tract
- ventral trigeminothalamic tract
- ventricle
- ventromedial nucleus of hypothalamus
- vermiform appendix
- vertebra
- vertebral artery
- vertebral body
- vertebral canal
- vertebral column
- vertebral vein
- vertebrobasilar system
- vertigo
- vesicle
- vesiculae seminales
- vestibular folds
- vestibular ganglion
- vestibular membrane
- vestibular nuclei
- Vestibule of the ear
- vestibulocerebellar fiber
- vestibulocerebellum
- vestibulocochlear nerve
- vestibuloocular reflexes
- vestibulospinal tract
- vibrissae
- vidian nerve
- vinculum (ligament)
- viscera
- visceromotor nuclei
- viscus
- Visible Human Project
- visual cortex
- visual fields
- visual radiation
- vitreous body
- vitreous humor
- vocal folds
- vocal ligaments
- vocalis muscle
- volvulus
- vomer
- vomeronasal organ
- vomiting center
- vorticosae
- vulva

== W ==
- Waldeyer's ring
- Wernicke's area
- Wharton's duct
- Wharton's jelly
- white matter
- withdrawal reflex
- wrist

== X ==
- xiphoid process

== Z ==
- zona incerta
- zona pellucida
- zootomy
- zygapophysis
- zygoma
- Zygomatic arch
- Zygomatic bone
- Zygomatic branches of the facial nerve
- Zygomaticus major muscle
- Zygomaticus minor muscle
- Zygomatic nerve
- Zygomatic process
- Zygomatic process of frontal bone
- Zygomatic process of maxilla
- Zygomatic process of temporal bone
- zygote
