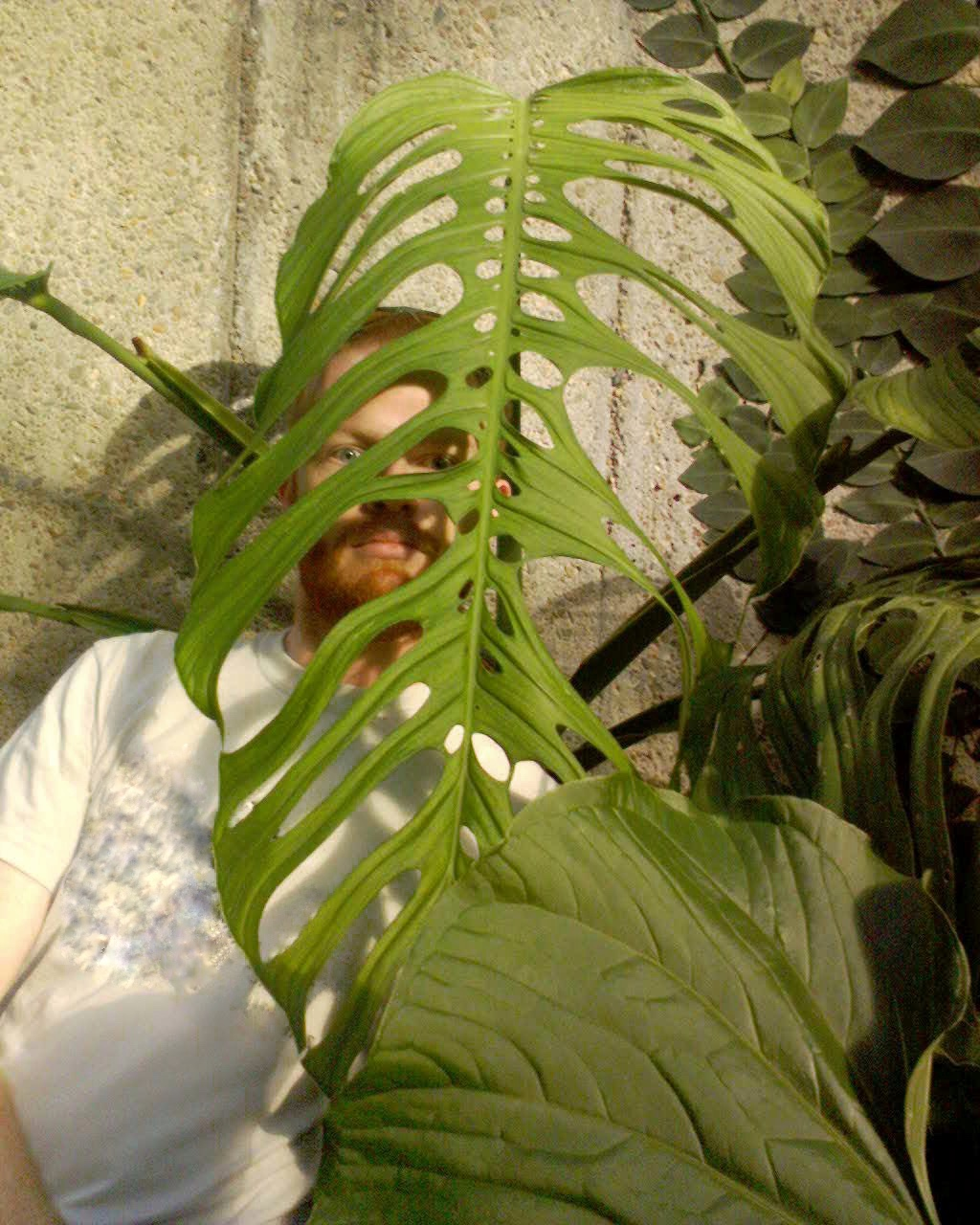
- Monstera sp. aff. lechleriana 'Esqueleto' at the Mount Coot-tha Botanic Gardens in 2008.

Scientific classification
- Kingdom: Plantae
- Clade: Tracheophytes
- Clade: Angiosperms
- Clade: Monocots
- Order: Alismatales
- Family: Araceae
- Tribe: Monstereae
- Genus: Monstera
- Species: M. sp. aff. lechleriana 'Esqueleto'

Binomial name
- Monstera sp. aff. lechleriana 'Esqueleto'

= Monstera 'Esqueleto' =

Species of flowering plant

Monstera 'Esqueleto' is an undescribed species of flowering plant in the family Araceae, of unknown provenance and without accompanying accession data. It has been widely cultivated in botanical gardens for many decades and may have been first shared from collections at the Royal Botanic Gardens, Kew, before recently becoming more widely available to the public. For many years, it was incorrectly identified as Monstera epipremnoides until 2019 when that species was being more thoroughly documented for a revision of Monstera species in Costa Rica. The plant in cultivation, finally known not to be M. epipremnoides, was now a nameless botanical mystery. Although it is not believed to be a cultivar, but rather a species collected from the wild, the cultivar name 'Esqueleto' was given to it by Jody Benicek as a placeholder name in order to be able to unambiguously refer to it until it receives a species epithet, pending publication. The location of its wild population is unknown.

== Description ==
Monstera 'Esqueleto' is a robust nomadic vine (frequently still erroneously referred to as a hemiepiphyte) comparable in many aspects of its morphology to Monstera lechleriana. Its growth habit, enormous size and tight internodal spacing at maturity, with leaf bases densely stacked in two rows like Ravenala are characteristic of the M. lechleriana species complex. For this reason, it can be referred to as Monstera sp. aff. lechleriana 'Esqueleto', however the cultivar name makes everything else after the genus redundant. In comparison with M. lechleriana and other undescribed varieties within the complex, M. 'Esqueleto' has leaf blades which are more intensely perforate, with small perforations near the midrib and larger ones extending towards the leaf margin, reminiscent of some morphotypes of M. adansonii ssp. laniata but on a larger scale and often with a noticeable droop. The leaf blades can be over a metre in length in a mature plant. The petioles have a persistent sheath which stays green for at least the majority of the life of the leaf itself. Its wings tend to be broad and held open, somewhat squared off at the top and seldom reach near the geniculum. The inflorescence has a very long spathe, internally cream-coloured and externally off-white blending to green at the bottom.

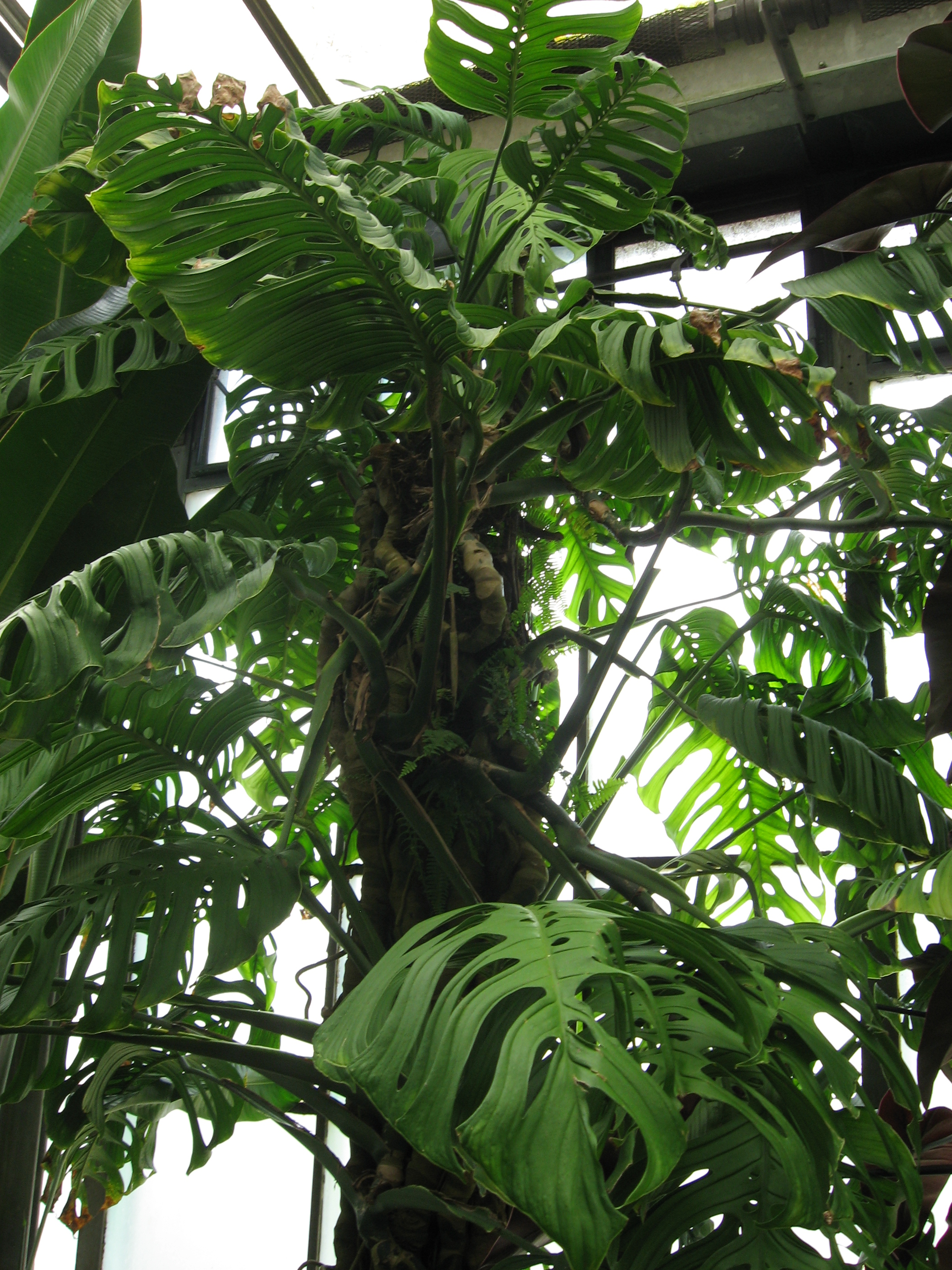
Monstera sp. aff. lechleriana 'Esqueleto'

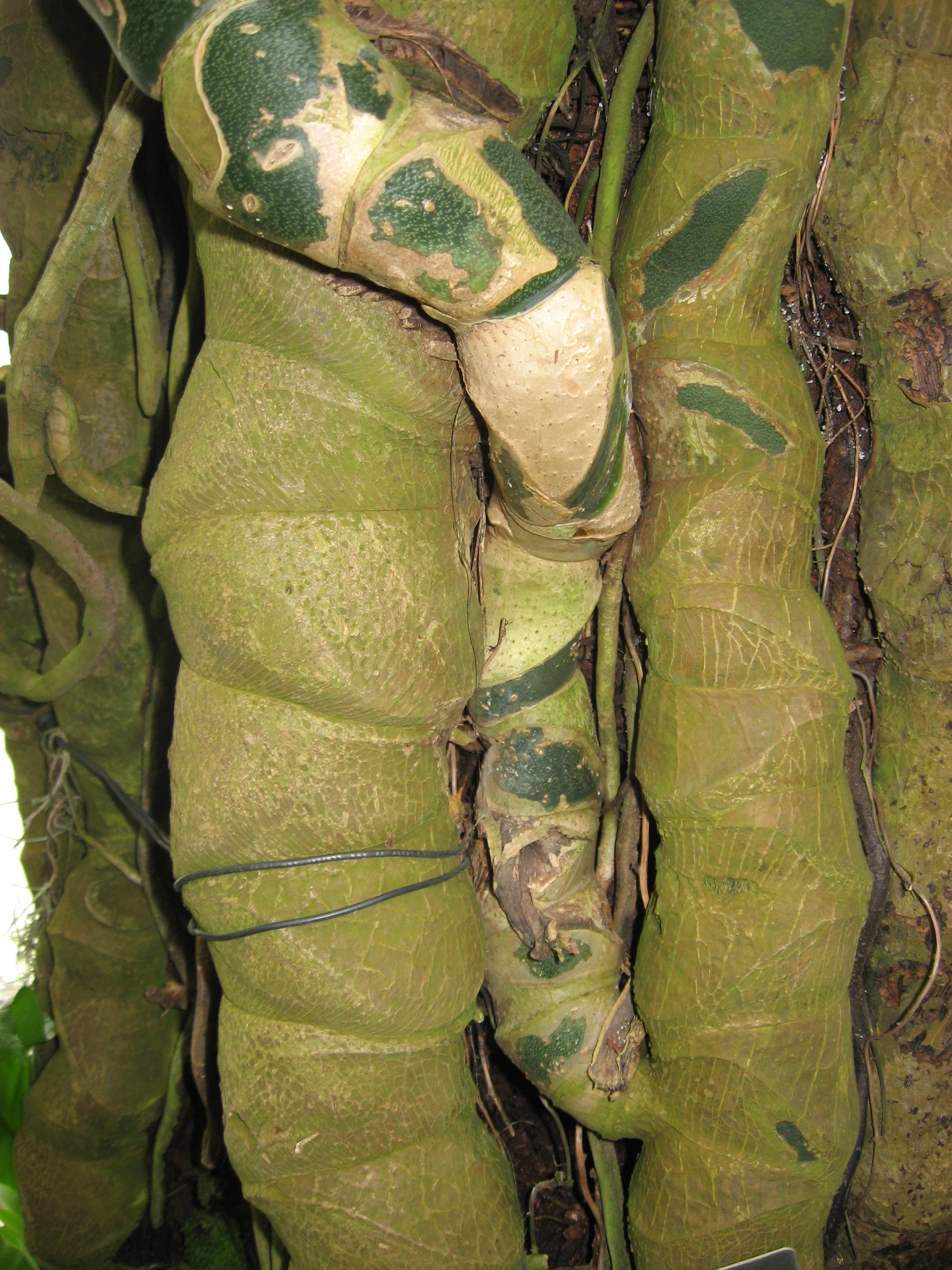
The stems of Monstera 'Esqueleto' showing closely packed leaf scars and aerial roots.
