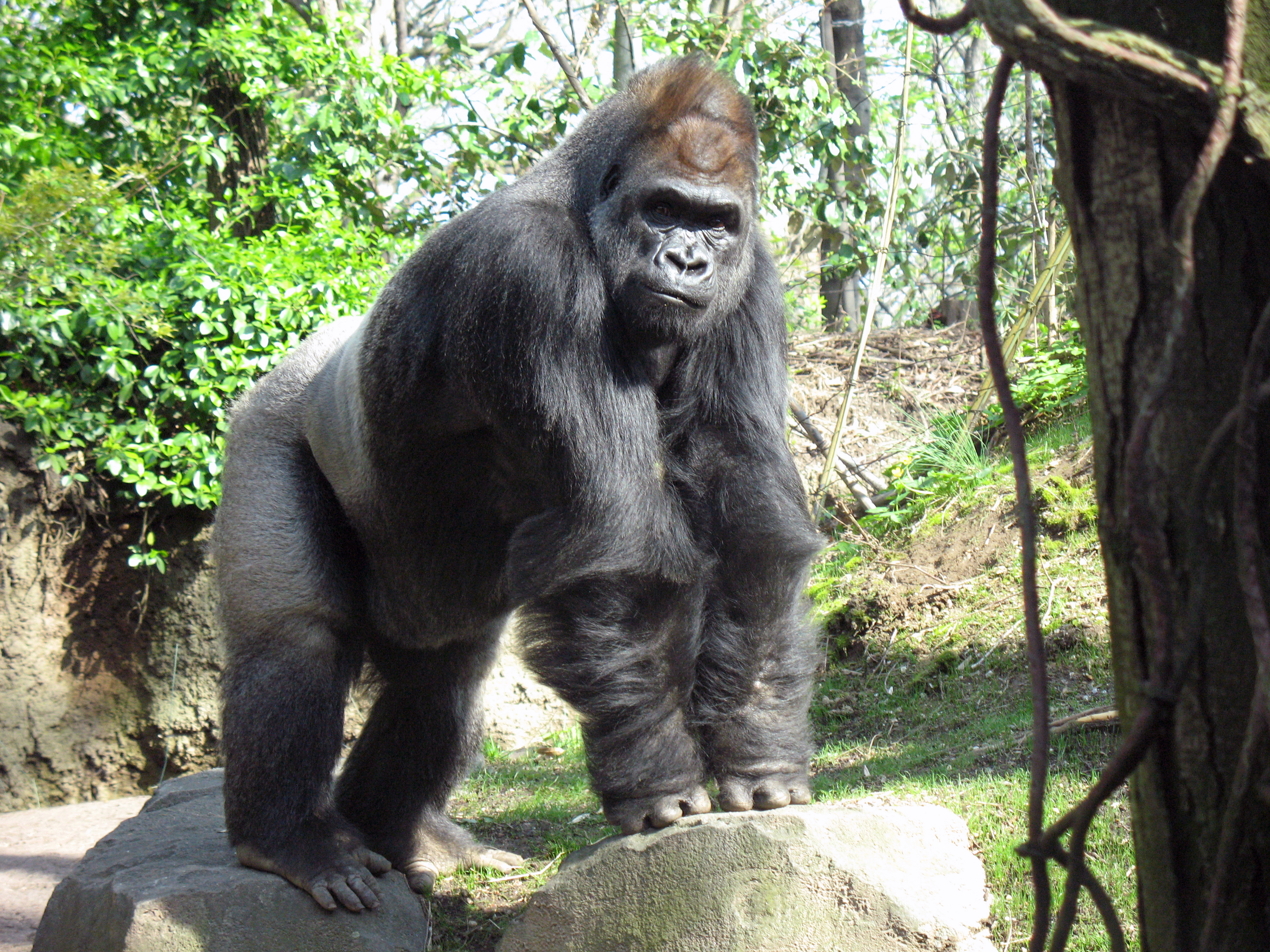
- Gorilla in the Bronx Zoo

Scientific classification (obsolete)
- Kingdom: Animalia
- Phylum: Chordata
- Class: Mammalia
- Infraclass: Placentalia
- Order: Primates
- Superfamily: Hominoidea
- Family: Pongidae; Elliot, 1913

Genera
- Gorilla; Pongo; Pan

Cladistically included but traditionally excluded taxa
- Homo

= Pongidae =

Pongidae Temporal range: Late Miocene to Recent

Obsolete ape taxon

Pongidae /ˈpɒndʒɪdiː/, or the pongids is an obsolete primate taxon containing chimpanzees, gorillas and orangutans. By this definition pongids were also called "great apes". This taxon is not used today but is of historical significance. The great apes are currently classified as Hominidae. This entry addresses the old usage of pongid.

The words "Pongidae" and "pongids" are sometimes used informally for the primate taxon containing orangutans and their extinct fossil relations. For this usage the currently most widely accepted name is Ponginae (or informally Asian hominids or pongines), the orangutan subfamily of the Hominidae or hominids. In current hominid taxonomy there is no “pongid” taxon. The orangutan taxon is now known to be paraphyletic to other (African) hominids. The orangutans are the only surviving species of the subfamily Ponginae, which genetically diverged from the other hominids (gorillas, chimpanzees and humans) between 19.3 and 15.7 million years ago. The subfamilies split somewhat later. The corresponding crown group for this taxon is Hominidae.

== Distinction of great apes (formerly pongids) to hominins ==
	Great apes (formerly pongids)	Humans (Note: Humans are the only extant Homininans.)
Mode of locomotion	Knuckle walking, arboreal	Bipedalism
Location of foramen magnum	Back of the skull	Under the skull
Skull (viewed from top)	pear-shaped	ovoid
Widest part of skull viewed from behind	Parietal region	Base of the skull(near the auditory region)
Palate	Rectangular	Parabolic
Body growth	Fast	Slow
Phalanges	Curved	Straight

=== Skull ===
The great ape (formerly pongid) skull contains the following features that are absent or less pronounced in humans:

- a sulcus behind the brow ridges
- prognathism
- a protruding occipital region
- large, bony eye sockets
- a large nasal opening
- constriction just behind the orbital region
- stout facial bones
- a diastema
- a simian shelf
- a larger, well pronounced brow ridge

=== Adaptations for locomotion ===
The following great ape (formerly Pongid) adaptations are for arboreal and knuckle walking locomotion and are not found in humans:

Great ape (formerly pongid}	Human
Arms are longer than the legs	Arms are shorter than the legs
Scapula has an orientation for supporting the body weight beneath the arms	Scapula is oriented for holding the arms by the side
Digits are long and curved for grasping branches	Digits are shorter and straight
Pelvis is shaped to support the legs and trunk in the bent-over posture	Pelvis is shaped to support the legs and trunk in a vertical position
Knees do not lock the legs	Knees lock the legs straight to minimize the expenditure of energy when standing
Pelvis is relatively large	Pelvis is much shorter and bowl-shaped
Iliac pillar is elongated	The iliac crest is oriented more to the side and slanted

== Similarity to hominins ==
The australopithecines show intermediate character states between great apes (formerly pongids) and humans, with Homo erectus (formerly Pithecanthropus) intermediate between australopithecines and humans. Members of the genus Homo share many key features with anatomically modern man.

== See also ==
- Anoiapithecus
- Chororapithecus
- History of hominoid taxonomy
- Pierolapithecus
- Samburupithecus
