= Impar =

Impar may refer to:

- IMPAR, a Cape Verdean insurance company
- Azygos (disambiguation), a synonym for impar, an anatomical word for unpaired

== See also ==
- Ganglion impar
