= Prearticular =

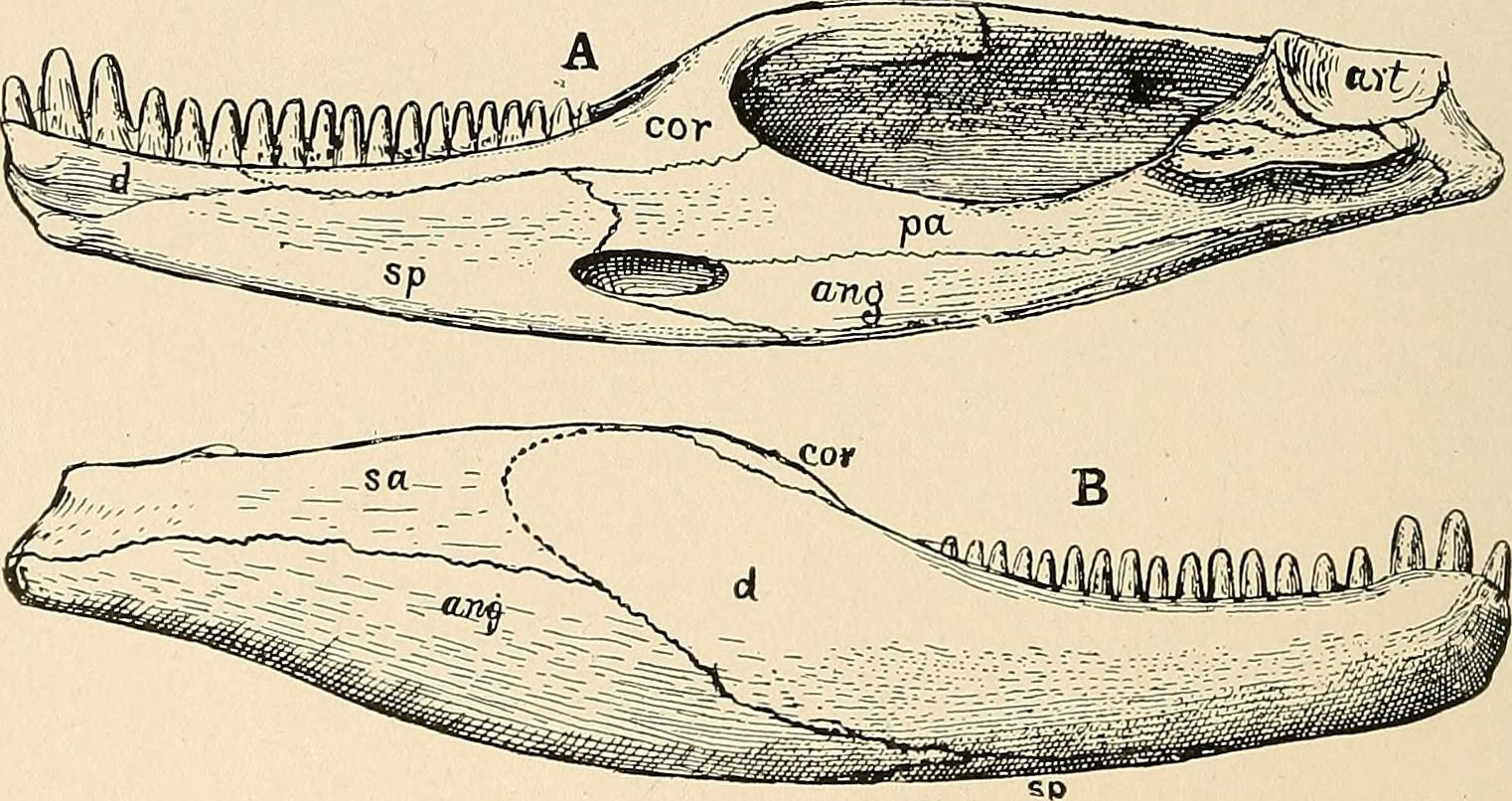
Hemimandible of Trimerorhachis; the prearticular (labeled "pa") is visible on the interior surface

The prearticular is a bone in the lower jaw of many vertebrates that lies on the inner surface of the mandible. It forms the inner margin of the adductor fossa. It bears teeth in some groups. It is present in both actinopterygians and sarcopterygians. The prearticular is in some ways the lower-jaw analogue of the pterygoid bone of the upper jaw, and together the prearticular and pterygoid form the lingual series of the inner dental arcade bones. In lungfish, the prearticular forms a large part of the lower jaw and bears the prearticular tooth plate. Mesoeucrocodylians, including modern crocodylians, lack a prearticular; the ossification centers that form the prearticular are incorporated into the coronoid and articular instead. In mammals, the prearticular fuses with the articular to form the malleus.
