= Lumbricalis =

Lumbricalis may refer to:

- the lumbrical muscles

== Species Latin names ==
- Amphisbaena lumbricalis, Vanzolini, 1996, a worm lizard species in the genus Amphisbaena
- Asteriacites lumbricalis, a five-rayed fossil found in rocks : see Asteriacites
- Euphorbia lumbricalis, L.C. Leach, 1986, a plant species in the genus Euphorbia
- Typhlops lumbricalis, a blind snake species
