= Peduncle =

Peduncle may refer to:

- Peduncle (botany), a stalk supporting an inflorescence, which is the part of the shoot of seed plants where flowers are formed
- Peduncle (anatomy), a stem, through which a mass of tissue is attached to a body
  - Peduncle (arthropods), the base segments of an antenna
  - Caudal peduncle, in fish, the narrow part of the body to which the tail attaches
  - Cerebral peduncle, a band of neurons, resembling a stalk, which connect varied parts of the brain
  - Cerebellar peduncle, one of six structures connecting the cerebellum to the brain stem
  - In insect brains, the peduncle connects the lobes of the mushroom bodies to its calyx
  - In stalked barnacles, one of two external divisions of the body, a stalk attached to the substrate by cement glands
  - In dinoflagellates, an extendable stalk used to capture prey.

== See also ==
- Pedicle (disambiguation)
