= Annulus =

Annulus (or anulus) or annular indicates a ring- or donut-shaped area or structure. It may refer to:

== Human anatomy ==
- Anulus fibrosus disci intervertebralis, spinal structure
- Annulus of Zinn, a.k.a. annular tendon or anulus tendineus communis, around the optic nerve
- Annular ligament (disambiguation)
- Digitus anularis, a.k.a. ring finger
- Anulus ciliaris, a.k.a. ciliary body
- Anulus femoralis, a.k.a. femoral ring
- Anulus inguinalis superficialis, a.k.a. superficial inguinal ring
- Anulus inguinalis profundus, a.k.a. deep inguinal ring
- Anuli fibrosi cordis, a.k.a. fibrous rings of heart
- Anulus umbilicalis , a.k.a. umbilical ring

== Biology ==
- Annulus (botany), structure on fern and moss sporangia
- Annulus (mycology), structure on mushroom
- Annulus (zoology), an external circular ring

== Other ==
- Annulus (construction), outer gear ring in an epicyclic gearing
- Annular lake, a ring-shaped lake caused by meteor impact
- Annulus (mathematics), the shape between two concentric circles
- Annulus (firestop), site of construction issue
- Annular piston, a ring-shaped piston
- Annulus (well), void between concentric cylinders
- Annular blowout preventer, device for sealing oil and gas wells
- Annulation, type of ring-producing chemical reaction

== See also ==
- Annulet (disambiguation)
- Annular eclipse
- Annular tropical cyclone
- Annular combustor, design option in engine
- Ring (disambiguation)
