= Lateral cervical nucleus =

The lateral cervical nucleus is a scattered nucleus located dorsally in the lateral funiculus in the first three cervical segments of the spine. The spinocervical and spinothalamic tracts synapse in the lateral cervical nucleus; the spinocervical tract projects ipsilaterally while the spinothalamic tract projects contralaterally. The axons of neurons from the lateral cervical nucleus cross the midline, join the medial lemniscus as it forms in the caudal medulla and ascend to the ventral posterolateral nucleus.
