= Ileal vessels =

Arteries and veins which supply or drain the ileum

Ileal arteries
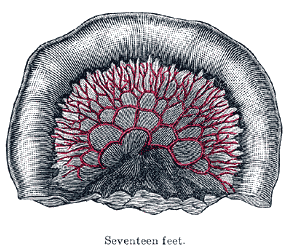
- Loop of ileum showing distribution of ileal arteries. The ileal veins follow a similar course.

In anatomy, the ileal vessels are the arteries and veins which supply or drain the ileum, the final section of the small intestine.

These are:

- Unnamed branches of the superior mesenteric artery (see also intestinal arteries)
- Unnamed tributaries of the superior mesenteric vein
