= Levator muscle =

Levator muscle can refer to:

- Levator scapulae muscle
- Levator palpebrae superioris muscle
- Levator ani
- Levator labii superioris alaeque nasi muscle
- Levator veli palatini
- Levator muscle of thyroid gland
- Levator labii superioris
- Levator anguli oris
