= Vasa recta =

Vasa recta is Latin for straight vessels and may refer to:

- Vasa recta (kidney)
- Vasa recta (intestines)
