= Carotid plexus =

Carotid plexus may refer to:

- Common carotid plexus
- Internal carotid plexus
- External carotid plexus, see Submandibular ganglion § Fibers
