= Annular ligament =

Annular ligament may refer to:

- Annular ligament of femur
- Annular ligaments of fingers
- Annular ligament of radius
- Annular ligament of stapes (also known as the stapediovestibular joint)
- Annular ligaments of trachea
- Annular ligaments of toes

== See also ==
- Annular
