= Posterior superior alveolar =

Posterior superior alveolar may refer to:

- Posterior superior alveolar nerve
- Posterior superior alveolar artery
