= Alveolar artery =

Alveolar artery may refer to:

- Anterior superior alveolar artery
- Middle superior alveolar artery
- Posterior superior alveolar artery
- Inferior alveolar artery

== See also ==
- Alveolus
