= Annulet =

Annulet may refer to:

- Annulet (heraldry), a mark in distinction
- Annulet (architecture), a fillet or ring encircling a column
- Annulet or Charissa obscurata, a species of moth in the family Geometridae

== See also ==
- Annulus (disambiguation)
