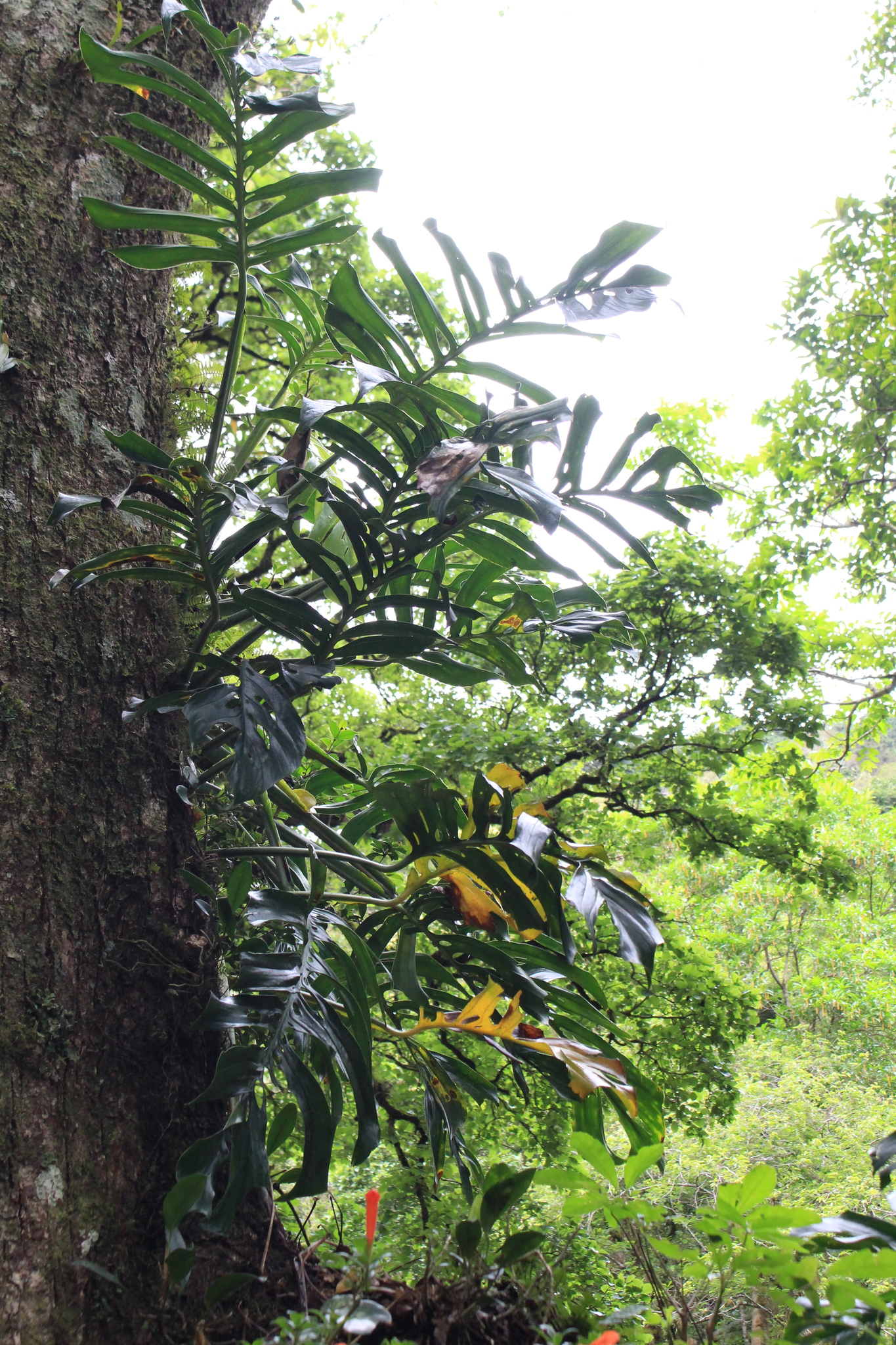
- Monstera epipremnoides

Scientific classification
- Kingdom: Plantae
- Clade: Tracheophytes
- Clade: Angiosperms
- Clade: Monocots
- Order: Alismatales
- Family: Araceae
- Genus: Monstera
- Species: M. epipremnoides

Binomial name
- Monstera epipremnoides Engl.

= Monstera epipremnoides =

Species of flowering plant

Monstera epipremnoides is a species of flowering plant in the family Araceae, endemic to Costa Rica and Panama. When mature, its leaf blades are up to approximately 70 cm in length and they are pinnatifid, with perforations regularly splitting through the leaf margin, dividing the leaves so that they have three to 15 lobes per side of the leaf, often with long internal fenestrations running along them.

== Confusion ==
A clone of another plant in cultivation was formerly thought to be of this species, but, in 2018, after comparison with wild populations of M. epipremnoides, the plant in cultivation was determined to be an undescribed species closer to Monstera lechleriana and, although it is believed to be a species collected from an unknown location in the wild, was registered under the cultivar name 'Esqueleto'.
