= Mylohyoid =

Mylohyoid can refer to:

- Mylohyoid muscle
- Mylohyoid line
- Mylohyoid nerve
- Mylohyoid branch of inferior alveolar artery
- Mylohyoid groove
