= Flexor retinaculum =

Flexor retinaculum may refer to:

- Flexor retinaculum of the hand (retinaculum musculorum flexorum manus)
- Flexor retinaculum of the foot (retinaculum musculorum flexorum pedis)
