= Common carotid plexus =

Network of nerve fibers of the neck

Details

Identifiers
- Latin: plexus caroticus communis
- TA98: A14.3.03.003
- TA2: 6644
- FMA: 67576

The carotid plexus is a network of intersecting sympathetic nerves which run parallel to the carotid artery into the head. They branch out from the superior cervical ganglia of the sympathetic chain. The lesser petrosal nerve receives sympathetic innervation from the carotid plexus along with parasympathetics from the glossopharyngeal nerve (CN IX).
