= Plica semilunaris =

Plica semilunaris can refer to:

- Plica semilunaris of conjunctiva
- Plica semilunaris of the fauces
- Plicae semilunares of the colon
