= Broner =

Broner is a surname. Notable people with the surname include:

- Adrien Broner (born 1989), American boxer
- E. M. Broner (1927–2011), American author

== See also ==
- Bronner
