= Cervical =

In anatomy, cervical is an adjective that has two meanings:

1. of or pertaining to any neck.
2. of or pertaining to the female cervix: i.e., the neck of the uterus.
- Commonly used medical phrases involving the neck are
  - cervical collar
  - cervical disc (intervertebral disc)
  - cervical lymph nodes
  - cervical nerves
  - cervical vertebrae
  - cervical rib
- Phrases that involve the uterine cervix include
  - cervical cancer
  - cervical smear or Pap smear
- In Dental terminology
  - Cervical margins
