= Innominate =

Innominate (from Latin: innominatus "nameless") may refer to:

- The brachiocephalic artery
- The brachiocephalic veins
- The hip bones
- An innominate contract, Latin contractus innominatus; in Roman law, a contract that does not fall within any of the regular types of contract
- Innominate term, in English contract law, an intermediate term that is neither a condition nor a warranty
- An innominate or anonymous jury, where the identity of the jury members is not publicly known
- Innominate (album), by Off Minor, 2004
- The Innominate, a mountain in the Bighorn Mountains, Wyoming, US
- Innominate Tarn, a small body of water in the Lake District National Park, UK (previously Loaf Tarn)

Innominata, from the same root, is used in:

- Substantia innominata, a part of the brain
- Iris innominata, a flower
