= Inferior vestibular nucleus =

Cluster of neurons in the brainstem

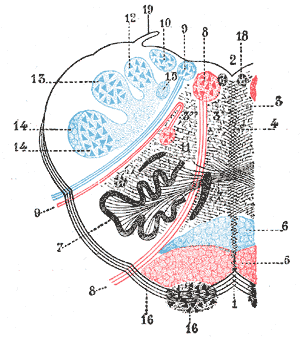
- Inferior vestibular nucleus is not labeled, but region is visible near #10

Details

Identifiers
- Latin: nucleus vestibularis inferior
- NeuroNames: 718
- NeuroLex ID: nlx_144004
- TA98: A14.1.04.243
- TA2: 6005
- FMA: 54608

The inferior vestibular nucleus is the vestibular nucleus which lies near the fourth ventricle.
