= Cribriform =

Cribriform (Latin for "perforated") can refer to:

- Cribriform plate, a bone structure between the brain and the nasal cavity
- Cribriform pattern of histopathological architecture
- Fascia cribrosa, a membrane in the leg, forms the anterior portion of the femoral canal
