= Spinocervical pathway =

Sensory neuron pathway

The spinocervical pathway is a four-neuron, fast-conducting, tactile/pressure pathway from the spinal cord to sensory cortex. It involves the primary sensory neuron in the dorsal root ganglion, second order cell in the dorsal horn, third order cell in the lateral cervical nucleus near C1 and C2, and a fourth order cell in VPL thalamus.

It is well developed in the cat, but vestigial in humans.
