= Styloid process =

In anatomy, a styloid process (from Greek stylos (στῦλος), "pillar"), usually serving as points of attachment for muscles, refers to the slender, pointed process (protrusion) of:

- temporal bone of the skull - Temporal styloid process
- radius bone of the lower arm - Radial styloid process
- ulna bone of the lower arm - Ulnar styloid process
- Third metacarpal - Third metacarpal styloid process
- Tibia and Fibula - Tibial process, fibular process.
- 5th metatarsal of the foot - also known as the tuberosity of the fifth metatarsal

In botany, a styloid is a needle-shaped crystal of calcium oxalate found in some plants. It is a form of raphide.
