= Pectinate =

Pectinate may refer to:

- Pectinate line, a line which divides the upper two thirds and lower third of the anal canal
- Pectinate muscles, parallel ridges in the walls of the atria of the heart
- A salt of the heteropolysaccharide pectin
