= Extensor retinaculum =

Extensor retinaculum may refer to:

- Extensor retinaculum of the hand
- Superior extensor retinaculum of foot
- Inferior extensor retinaculum of foot
