= Posterior septal artery =

Blood vessel

The posterior septal artery is a branch of the sphenopalatine artery. The posterior septal artery supplies blood to the respiratory region of the nasal septum, which consists of the lower two-thirds of the nasal septum and most of the nasal floor. The path of the posterior septal artery can be understood by splitting it into three different segments: the pterygopalatine segment, the sphenoidal segment, and the septal segment.

In most cases, the posterior septal artery divides from the sphenopalatine artery in the pterygopalatine fossa. This part of the posterior septal artery is called the pterygopalatine segment. The posterior septal artery passes through the sphenopalatine foramen to enter the nasal cavity. To enter the posterior border of the nasal septum, the posterior septal artery travels along the anterior wall of the sphenoid sinus passing by the sphenoid ostium and choana. This part of the posterior septal artery is called the sphenoidal segment. In this segment, the posterior septal artery becomes divided into a superior and inferior branch. The superior and inferior branches of the posterior septal artery each split into the terminal septal branches that supply blood to the respiratory portion of the nasal septum. This region of the posterior septal artery is named the septal segment.

== See also ==
- Posterior septal branches of sphenopalatine artery
