= Arterial arcades =

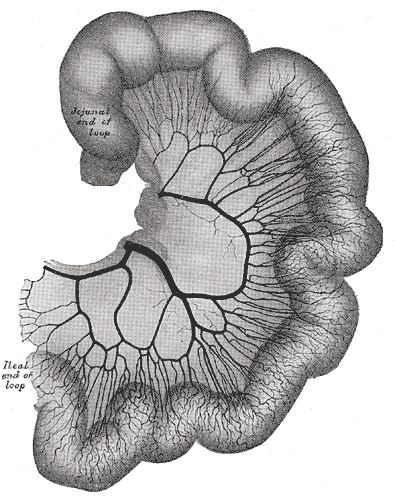
- Loop of small intestine showing distribution of intestinal arteries

The arterial arcades (intermesenteric arterial anastomoses or Riolan arcades) are a series of anastomosing arterial arches between the arterial branches of the jejunum and ileum.

Nearest the duodenum the mesenteric loops are primary, the vasa recta are long and regular in distribution, and the translucent spaces (lunettes) are extensive.

Toward the ileocolic junction, secondary and tertiary loops are observed, the vessels are smaller and become obscured by numerous fat-tabs.

The diagrams below show the arrangement and variations of the loops of the mesenteric vessels for various segments of the small intestine of average length:

== Additional images ==
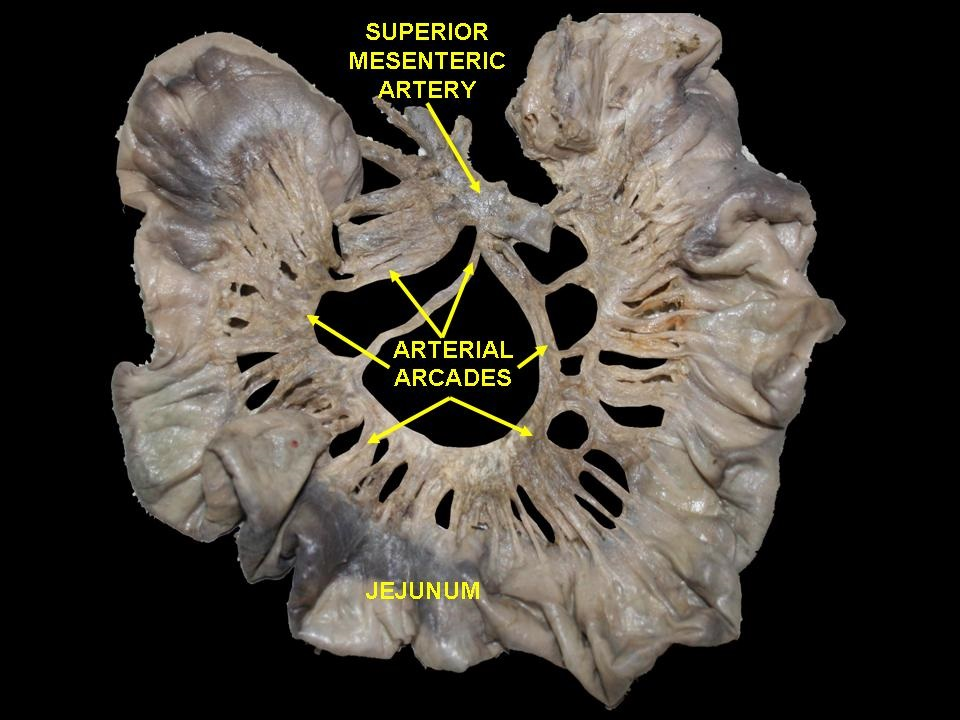
Arterial arcades

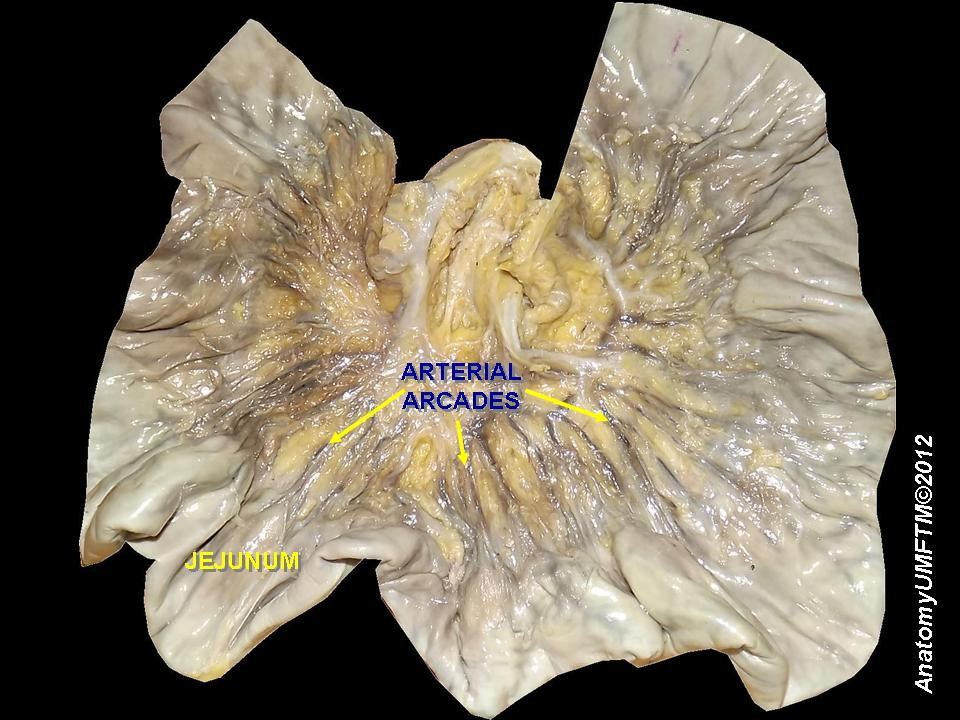
Arterial arcades

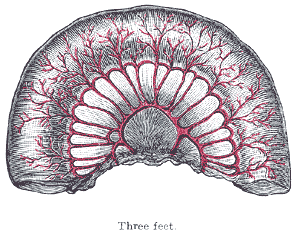
Loop of small intestine showing distribution of intestinal arteries

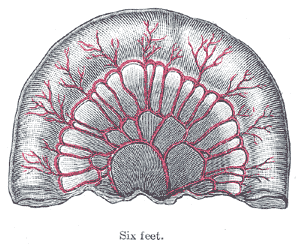
Loop of small intestine showing distribution of intestinal arteries

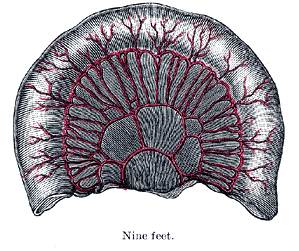
Loop of small intestine showing distribution of intestinal arteries

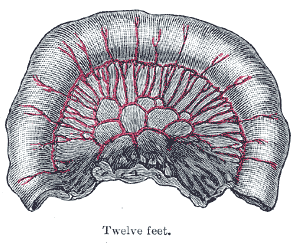
Loop of small intestine showing distribution of intestinal arteries

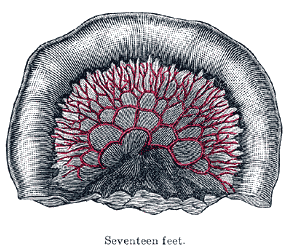
Loop of small intestine showing distribution of intestinal arteries

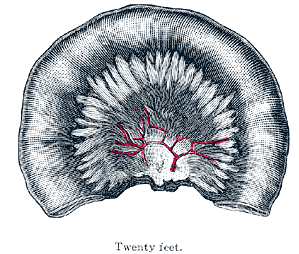
Loop of small intestine showing distribution of intestinal arteries

== See also ==
- Intestinal arteries
