= Corniculate =

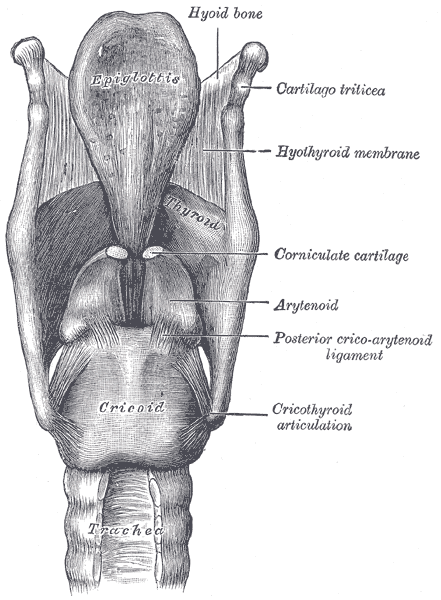
Larynx with corniculate cartilages indicated at center.

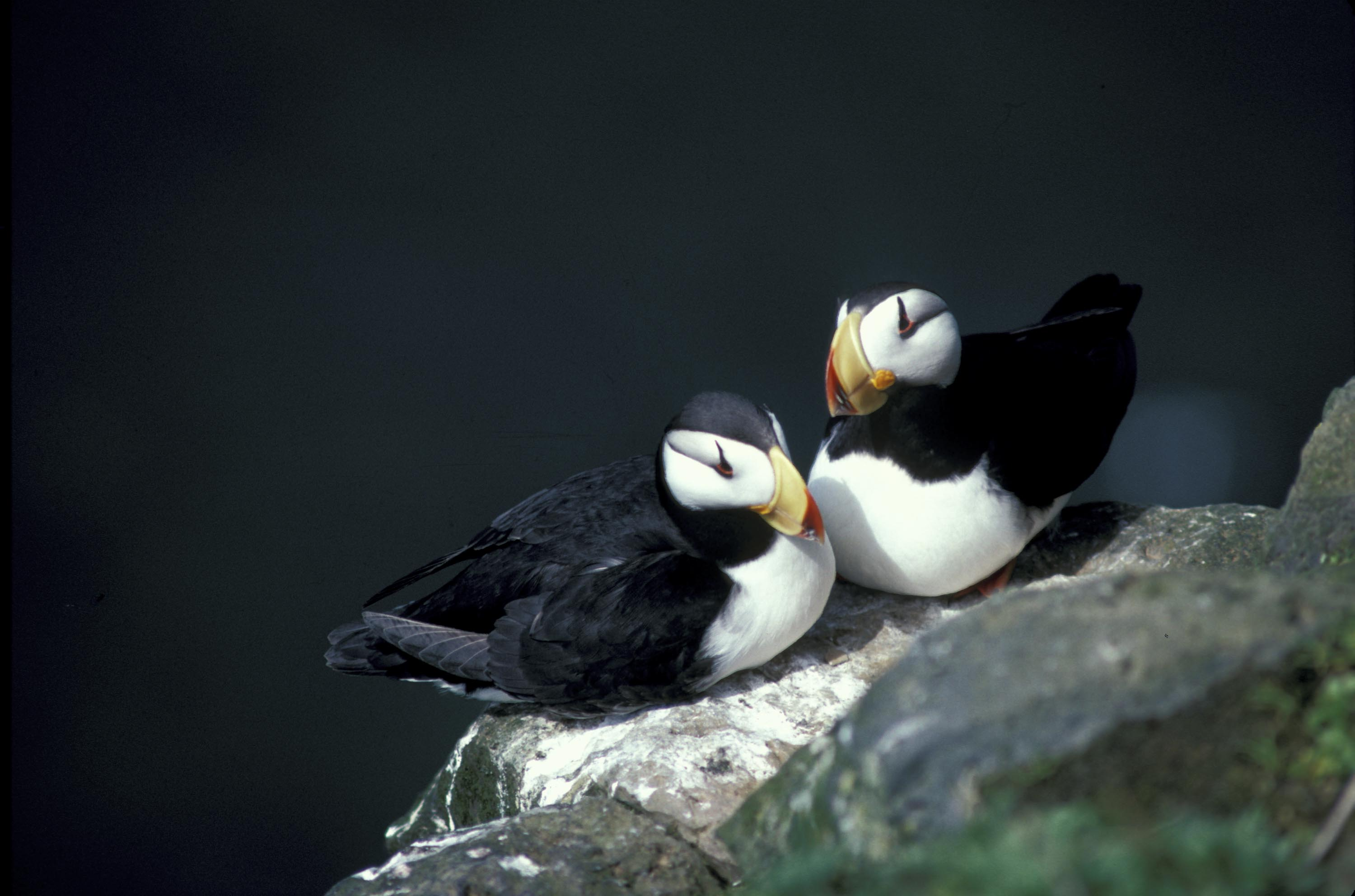
The horned puffin Fratercula corniculata

Corniculate, an Anglicisation of the Latin diminutives corniculata, corniculatum, and corniculatus, describes an object possessing hornlike extensions. The root is Latin cornu = "horn". The term is used to describe the shape of the corniculate cartilages of the larynx. The horned puffin (Fratercula corniculata) is named for its distinctive horn-like coloration. Likewise Oxalis corniculata (creeping woodsorrel) is named for its two erect capsules, which resemble little horns, and the bird's-foot trefoil Lotus corniculatus and goat's horn mangrove Aegiceras corniculatum are named for their horn-shaped fruits.
