= Cingulum =

Cingulum, from the Latin for belt or girdle, may refer to:

- Cingulum (brain), white matter fibers found in the brain
- Cingulum (tooth), a shelf at the margin of a tooth
- A type of groove encircling the theca of dinoflagellates
- Cingulum (Christianity), a girdle used by religious brothers, monks, and clergy in Christianity (particularly those of the Catholic and Evangelical-Lutheran denominations)
- Cingulum (Wicca), a ritual cord used in British traditional Wicca
- Cingulum militare, Ancient Roman belts decorated with metal fittings worn as a badge of rank by soldiers and officials
- Ancient Roman town on the site of what is now the Italian town of Cingoli.
- Shoulder girdle or pectoral girdle
