= Intestinal arteries =

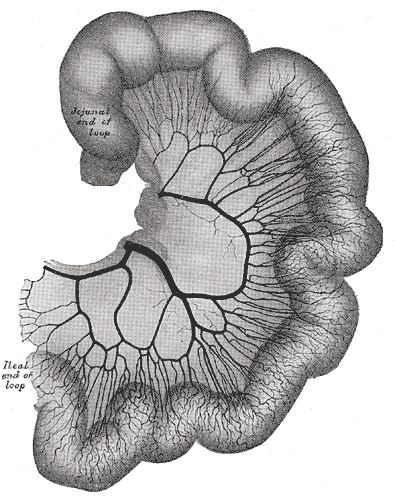
- Loop of small intestine showing distribution of intestinal arteries.

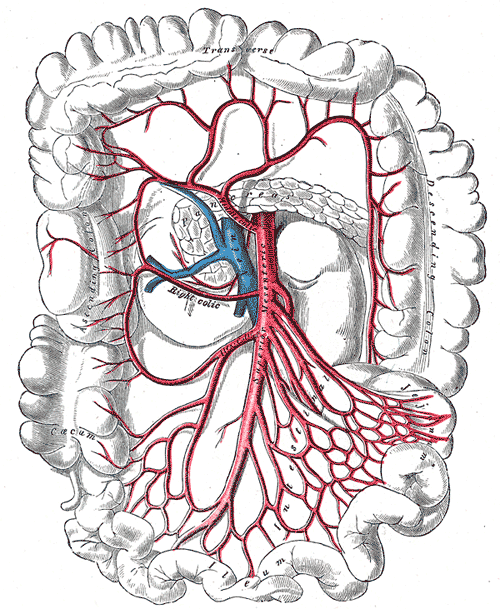
- The superior mesenteric artery and its branches.

Details

Identifiers
- Latin: arteriae intestinales

The intestinal arteries arise from the convex side of the superior mesenteric artery. They are usually from twelve to fifteen in number, and are distributed to the jejunum and ileum.

== Nomenclature ==
The term "intestinal arteries" can be confusing, because these arteries only serve a small portion of the intestines.

- They do not supply any of the large intestine. The large intestine is primarily supplied by the right colic artery, middle colic artery, and left colic artery.
- They do not supply the duodenum of the small intestine. The duodenum is primarily supplied by the inferior pancreaticoduodenal artery and superior pancreaticoduodenal artery.

For clarity, some sources prefer instead using the more specific terms ileal arteries and jejunal arteries.

== Path ==
They run nearly parallel with one another between the layers of the mesentery, each vessel dividing into two branches, which unite with adjacent branches, forming a series of arches (arterial arcades), the convexities of which are directed toward the intestine.

From this first set of arches branches arise, which unite with similar branches from above and below and thus a second series of arches is formed; from the lower branches of the artery, a third, a fourth, or even a fifth series of arches may be formed, diminishing in size the nearer they approach the intestine.

In the short, upper part of the mesentery only one set of arches exists, but as the depth of the mesentery increases, second, third, fourth, or even fifth groups are developed.

The differences between the ileal arteries and the jejunal arteries can be summarized as follows:

Type	Appearance	Number of arcades	Layer of fat
jejunal arteries		one (or few)	thin
ileal arteries		many	thick

From the terminal arches numerous small straight vessels (vasa recta) arise which encircle the intestine, upon which they are distributed, ramifying between its coats.

From the intestinal arteries small branches are given off to the lymph glands and other structures between the layers of the mesentery.

== Additional images ==
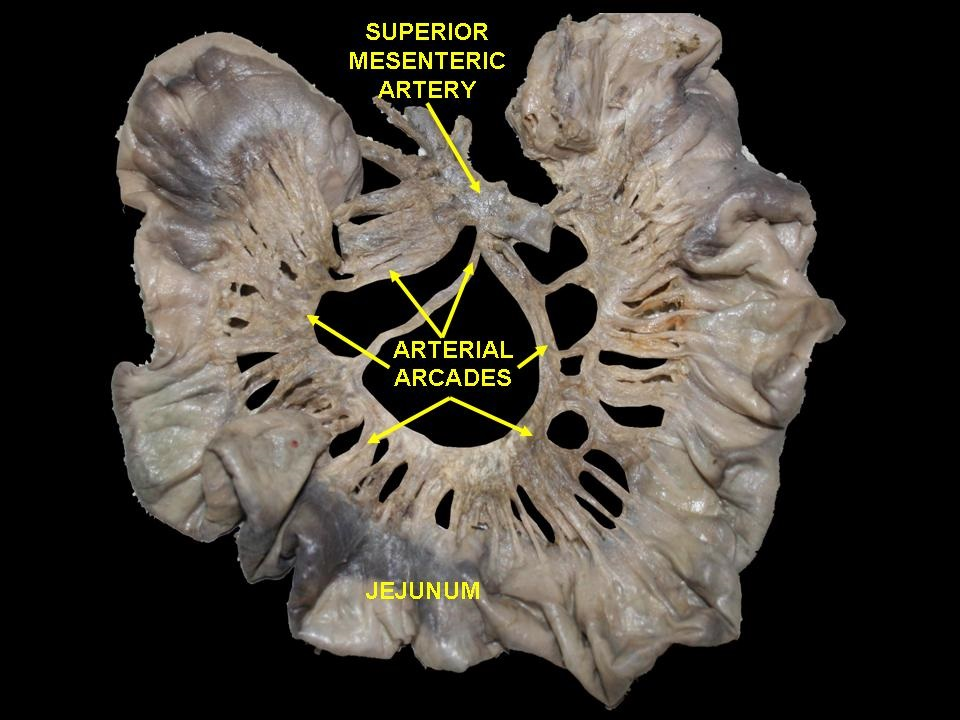
Superior mesenteric artery

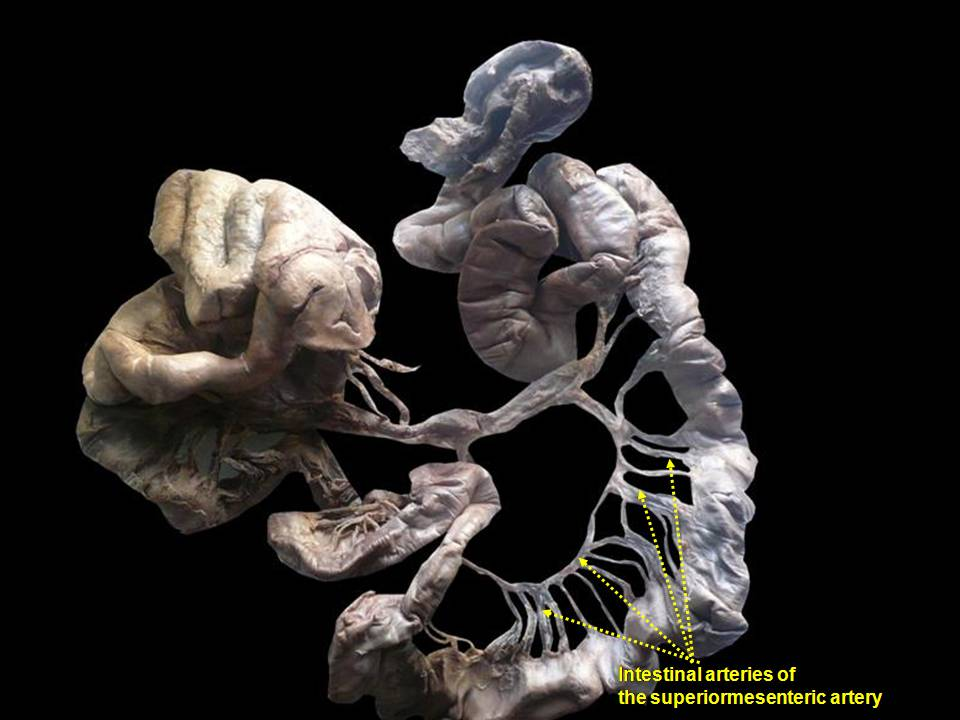
Intestinal arteries of the superior mesenteric artery. Plastination technique.
