= Levator muscle of thyroid gland =

Human muscle

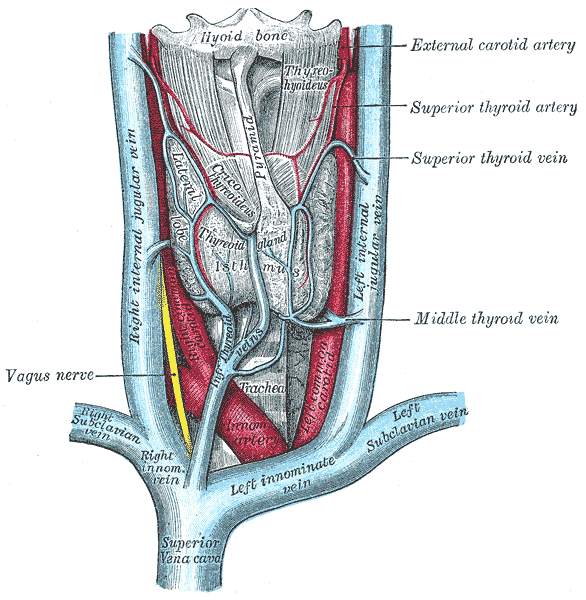
- The thyroid gland and its relations. (Levator muscle not labeled, but region is visible.)

Details
- Origin: Thyrohyoid muscle
- Insertion: Thyroid isthmus
- Nerve: Ansa cervicalis

Identifiers
- Latin: musculus levator glandulae thyroideae
- TA98: A04.2.04.008
- TA2: 2175
- FMA: 13345

A fibrous or muscular band is sometimes found attached, above, to the body of the hyoid bone, and below to the thyroid isthmus, or its pyramidal lobe. When muscular, it is termed the levator muscle of thyroid gland.
