= Hypophysial artery =

There are two hypophysial arteries:

- Superior hypophysial artery
- Inferior hypophysial artery
