= Funiculus =

Funiculus (Latin for "slender rope") is any cord-like structure in anatomy or biology, and may refer to:

== Anatomy ==
- the spermatic cord formed by the vas deferens and surrounding tissue
- the umbilical cord attaching a fetus to the placenta during pregnancy

=== Neuroanatomy ===
- A funiculus or column is a small bundle of axons (nerve fibres), enclosed by the perineurium.

- In the central nervous system, a funiculus is one of the paired white matter regions of the spinal cord: the anterior funiculus, the lateral funiculus, and the posterior funiculus.
- In the fourth ventricle, the funiculus separans is a strip of ependyma.

- In the peripheral nervous system, a funiculus is a bundle of axons that may be bundled into a nerve fascicle

== Biology ==
- in insect antennae, the funicle is the segment connecting the club with the base
- in flowering plants, the funiculus is the stalk that attaches an ovule to the placenta
- in mycology, the funicular cord is a sticky trailing thread that attaches the peridioles (the "eggs") to the peridium (the "nest") in some species of bird's nest fungi
- in malacology, a funicle is a cord-like spiral ridge within the umbilical area of the shell that runs into or partly fills the umbilicus.
