= Vagus ganglion =

A vagus ganglion (plural: vagus ganglia) is a small, elongated ganglion located between the esophagus and aorta. They mark the terminus of the recurrent nerve.

== See also ==
- Nervous system
- Neuron
- Ganglion
