= Lacrimal fossa =

Lacrimal fossa can refer to:

- Fossa for lacrimal gland
- Fossa for lacrimal sac
