= Inguinal =

In human anatomy, the inguinal /ˈɪŋɡwənəl/ region refers to either the groin or the lower lateral regions of the abdomen. It may also refer to:

- Conjoint tendon, previously known as the inguinal aponeurotic falx, a structure formed from the transversus abdominis insertion into the pecten pubis
- Granuloma inguinale, a bacterial disease characterized by ulcerative genital lesions that is endemic in many less developed regions
- Inguinal canal, a passage in the anterior abdominal wall which in men conveys the spermatic cord and in women the round ligament
- Inguinal falx, the conjoined tendon of the obliquus internus and transversus muscles
- Inguinal hernia, a protrusion of abdominal-cavity contents through the inguinal canal
  - Direct inguinal hernia, a type of inguinal hernia with a sac that is medial to the inferior epigastric vessels
  - Indirect inguinal hernia, a hernia that results from the failure of the embryonic internal inguinal ring after the testicle has passed through it
- Inguinal ligament, a ligament that runs from the pubic tubercle to the anterior superior iliac spine
- Inguinal lymph node a type of lymph node in the inguinal region
  - Deep inguinal lymph nodes, three to five deep lymph nodes that are located medial to the femoral vein and under the cribriform fascia
  - Superficial inguinal lymph nodes, ten superficial lymph nodes that form a chain immediately below the inguinal ligament
- Inguinal orchiectomy, a surgical procedure to remove a testicle
- Inguinal ring, the two openings of the inguinal canal
  - Deep inguinal ring, the entrance to the inguinal canal
  - Superficial inguinal ring, a triangular opening that forms the exit of the inguinal canal
- Inguinal triangle, a region of the abdominal wall, also known by the eponym Hesselbach's triangle
- Lateral inguinal fossa, a shallow concave stretch of peritoneum on the deep surface of the anterior abdominal wall
- Medial inguinal fossa a depression located within the inguinal triangle on the peritoneal surface of the anterior abdominal wall
- Reflected inguinal ligament, a triangular layer of tendinous fibers formed by the medial fibers of the external abdominal oblique aponeurosis
- Inguinal amplexus - An amphibian mating posture, where the male uses his forelimbs to clasp around the female's waist (inguinal) region.
