= Pectoral =

Pectoral may refer to:

- The chest region and anything relating to it.
- Pectoral cross, a cross worn on the chest
- a decorative, usually jeweled version of a gorget
- Pectoral (Ancient Egypt), a type of jewelry worn in ancient Egypt
- Pectoralis major muscle, commonly referred to as "pectorals" or "pecs"
- Pectoralis minor muscle
- Pectoral fins of an aquatic animal, such as a whale or fish, located on both sides of the body
- Pectoral sandpiper, a bird
