= Auditory meatus =

Auditory meatus may refer to:

- External auditory meatus
- Internal auditory meatus
