= Infundibulum =

An infundibulum (Latin for funnel; plural, infundibula) is a funnel-shaped cavity or organ.

== Anatomy ==
- Brain: the pituitary stalk, also known as the infundibulum and infundibular stalk, is the connection between the hypothalamus and the posterior pituitary.
- Hair follicle: the infundibulum is the cup or funnel in which a hair follicle grows.
- Infundibulum (heart): The infundibulum of the heart, or conus arteriosus, is the outflow portion of the right ventricle.
- Lung: The alveolar sacs of the lungs, from which the air chambers (alveoli) open, are also called infundibula.
- Sinus (anatomy): The ethmoidal infundibulum is the most important of three infundibula of the nose: the frontal infundibulum and the maxillary infundibulum flow into it.
- Infundibulum of uterine tube: the funnel-like end of the mammal oviduct nearest to the ovary.
- Gallbladder: The Infundibulum of the gallbladder (also known as the "neck" of the gallbladder) is the end of nearest to the cystic duct, which is often dilated relative to the body of the gallbladder, and is a common site for gallstones.
- Renal pelvis, sometimes called the renal infundibulum

== Veterinary medicine ==
- Infundibulum (tooth): In horses, other equines and ruminants, the infundibulum of a tooth is the central cup or funnel of tooth enamel and cementum.

== Botany ==
- Glossary of botanical terms: infundibular means "funnel-shaped" in plant morphology, for example referring to the corolla of some flowers.

== Other uses ==
- Cephalopod limb: The outer shallow cavity of a sucker on a Cephalopod limb is called an infundibulum.
- Infundibulum (gastropod), a genus of sea snail
- In the science fiction novel The Sirens of Titan by Kurt Vonnegut, a "chronosynclastic infundibulum" is a kind of wormhole through time and space, defined as "where all the different kinds of truths fit together".
- Ian McDonald (British author) - the Everness science fiction series is about the adventures of Everett Singh, a British boy whose understanding of the use of a quantum mechanics and an infundibulum device permits him to travel to parallel worlds under the many-worlds interpretation of quantum physics.

== See also ==
- Body cavity
- Infundibulops
