= Fornix =

Fornix (pl.: fornices, Latin for "arch") may refer to:

- Fornix or throat scale, a bowed prolongation of the corolla in Boraginaceae (cf.)
- Fornix of the brain
- Fornix conjunctiva, a part of the conjunctiva
- Fornix vaginae, also called the vaginal fornix
- An early type of Roman triumphal arch
