= Saphenous =

Saphenous may refer to one of two saphenous veins or the saphenous nerve in the leg:

- Great saphenous vein
- Small saphenous vein
- Saphenous nerve
