= Rete =

Rete may refer to:

- Net (device), in Latin
- The Network (Italian: La Rete), a former Italian political party
- Rete algorithm, an efficient pattern matching algorithm for implementing production rule systems
- Part of an astrolabe, a historical astronomical instrument
- Net-like anatomic structures: Rete canalis hypoglossi, Rete carpale dorsale, Rete mirabile, Rete ovarii, Rete patellare, Rete pegs and ridges, Rete testes, Rete venosum.

== See also ==
- Plexus
- Rete Ferroviaria Italiana (RFI), an Italian company, owner of Italy's railway network
- Rete degli Studenti Medi (RSM), an Italian high school students network
