= Introitus =

Entrance into a canal or hollow organ

An introitus is an entrance into a canal or hollow organ. The vaginal introitus is the opening that leads to the vaginal canal.
