= Vasa recta (intestines) =

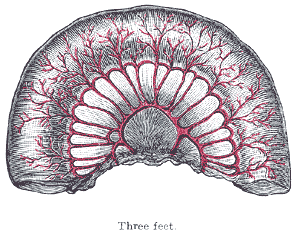

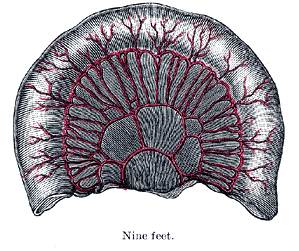

Vasa recta are straight arteries arising from arterial arcades (anastomoses of the jejunal and ileal arteries, branches of superior mesenteric artery) in the mesentery of the jejunum and ileum that supply the jejunum and ileum.

The vasa recta of the jejunum are long and few, compared to the ileum where they are numerous and short.

== Additional images ==
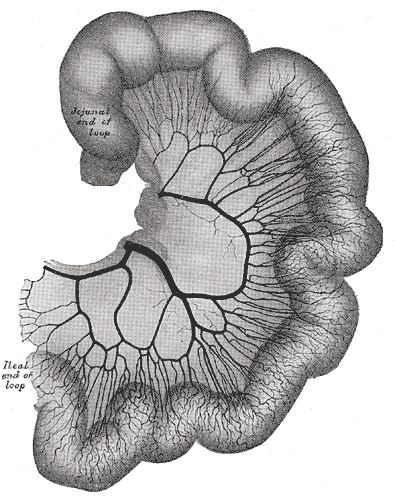
Loop of small intestine showing distribution of intestinal arteries.

== See also ==
- Intestinal arteries
