= Oblique muscle =

Several muscles in the human body may be referred to as an oblique muscle:

- Abdominal wall
  - Abdominal external oblique muscle
  - Abdominal internal oblique muscle
- Extraocular muscles
  - Inferior oblique muscle
  - Superior oblique muscle
- Oblique muscle of auricle, part of the outer ear

== See also ==
- Oblique strain, an injury of either of these muscles, common in baseball
