= Cubital =

Cubital relates to the cubit or ulna and may refer to:

- Cubital fossa, the triangular area on the anterior view of the elbow joint of the arm
- Cubital index, the ratio of two of the wing vein segments of honeybees
- Cubital tunnel, channel which allows the Ulnar nerve (commonly known as the "funny bone") to travel over the elbow
- Median cubital vein, superficial vein of the upper limb
