= Iliac lymph nodes =

Iliac lymph nodes may refer to:

- External iliac lymph nodes
- Internal iliac lymph nodes
