= Linea alba =

Linea alba can refer to:

- Linea alba (abdomen)
- Linea alba (cheek)
