= Caudate =

Caudate (Latin for "tail") may refer to:

- Caudate nucleus
- Caudate leaf shape
- Caudate lobe of liver
- Cauda equina
- A salamander (which is any member of the order Caudata)
