= Sublingual fovea =

Anatomical depression of the mandible

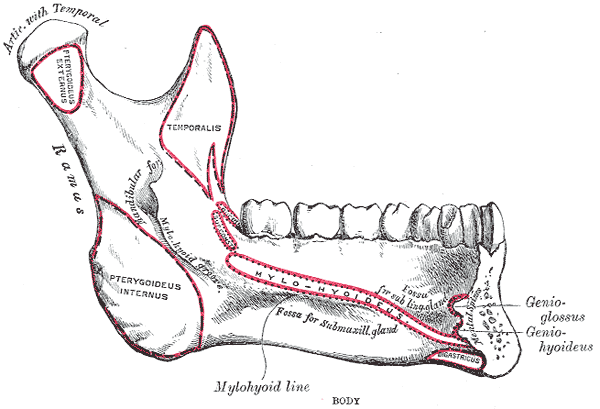
- Mandible. Inner surface. Side view.

Details

Identifiers
- Latin: fovea sublingualis
- TA98: A02.1.15.014
- TA2: 850
- FMA: 59434

The sublingual fovea (or sublingual fossa) is a fovea in the mandible for the sublingual gland.

== Additional images ==
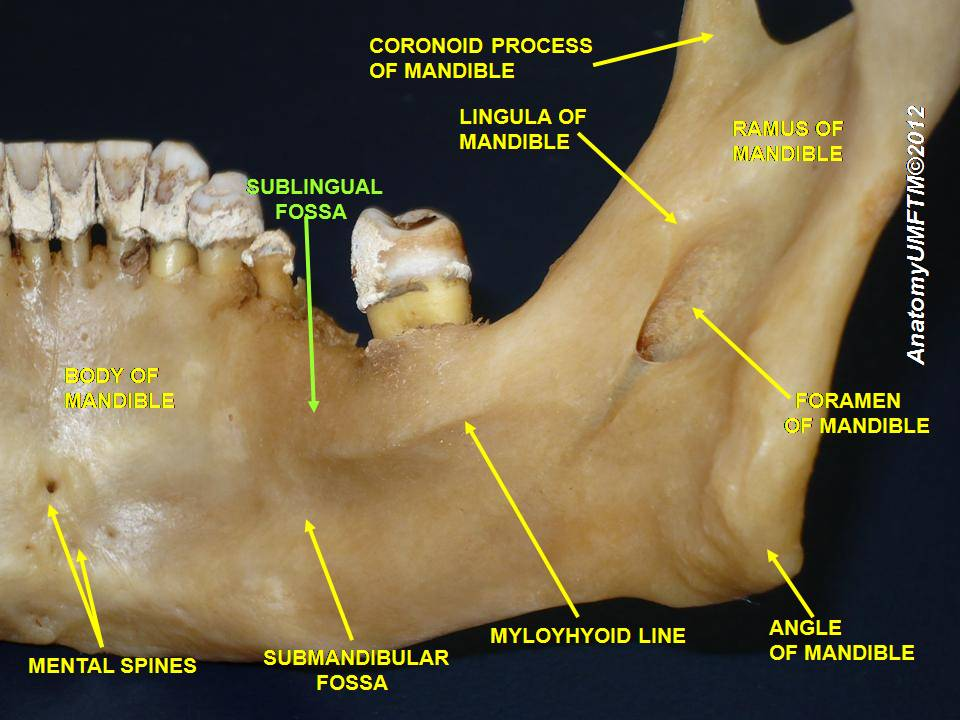
Sublingual fossa
