= Gemellus =

Gemellus may refer to:

- Tiberius Julius Caesar Nero Gemellus (19–37 AD), son of Drusus Julius Caesar and adopted son of Caligula;
- Tiberius Claudius Caesar Germanicus Gemellus (19–23 AD), twin brother of the previous, died as an infant;
- St. Gemellus of Ancyra (d. 362 AD), Christian martyr;
- Gemellus, a pen-name of Voltaire

== Muscles ==
- Superior gemellus muscle, a muscle in the human body;
- Inferior gemellus muscle, a muscle in the human body.
