= Superior alveolar arteries =

The superior alveolar arteries are two or three arteries supplying the upper teeth and related structures:

- The posterior superior alveolar artery, a branch of the maxillary artery that serves the upper teeth and other related structures
- The anterior superior alveolar artery, a branch of the infraorbital artery, also supplying the upper teeth and related structures
- The middle superior alveolar artery, an inconstant branch of the infraorbital artery that forms anastomoses with the other two superior alveolar arteries
