= Annular ligaments of toes =

Ligaments of the toes

Details
- From: phalanx
- To: phalanx

Identifiers
- Latin: pars anularis vaginae fibrosae digitorum pedis

The annular ligaments of the toes are the annular part of the fibrous sheathes of the toes.

These strong transverse bands of fibrous tissue cross the flexor tendons at the level of the upper half of the proximal phalanges of the foot.
