= Lateral horn =

Lateral horn may refer to:

- Lateral horn of insect brain (an olfactory area)
- Lateral horn of spinal cord
