= Pulvinar =

Pulvinar (/pʌlˈvaɪnər/) can mean:

- The pulvinar thalami, comprising the pulvinar nuclei within the thalamus (part of the brain)
- A layer of extrasynovial fibrofatty tissue contained within the acetabular fossa of the hip
- The pulvinar tunicae internae segmenti arterialis anastomosis arteriovenae glomeriformis, part of a glomus body
- An ancient Roman instance of an empty throne (hetoimasia), a cushioned couch for occupation by a deity in various religions
