= Annulus fibrosus =

Annulus fibrosus or anulus fibrosus may refer to:

- Anulus fibrosus cordis, fibrous ring of heart
- Anulus fibrosus disci intervertebralis, fibrous ring of intervertebral disk
- Anulus fibrosus tympani, annulus surrounding the membrana tympani
