= Caruncle =

Caruncle (from Latin: caruncula, 'wart') may refer to:

- Caruncle (bird anatomy), a small, fleshy excrescence that is a normal part of an animal's anatomy
- Caruncle, an elaiosome (fleshy structure attached to the seed), especially in the plant family Euphorbiaceae
- Caruncle, an appendage to the prostomium of a worm's body
- Sublingual caruncle, an area on the human tongue
- Lacrimal caruncle, the nodule at the inner corner of the human eye
- Urethral caruncle, a benign outgrowth of the urethra
