= Incisura =

Incisura is Latin for "notch", and may refer to:

- Incisura (gastropod), a genus of keyhole limpets
- Angular incisure, which varies somewhat in position with the state of distension of the stomach
- Suprascapular notch, a notch in the superior border of the scapula, just medial to the base of the coracoid process
- It may also sometimes refer to the Dicrotic notch seen with aorta pressure
- Cardiac notch of stomach (incisura cardiaca), where the left margin of the oesophagus joins the greater curvature of the stomach
