= Thyroepiglottic muscle =

Muscle of the larynx

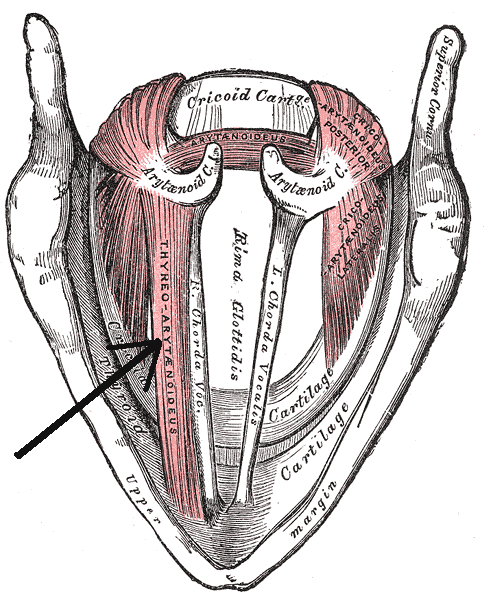
- Muscles of the larynx, seen from above. Arrow shows the aryepiglottic muscle, not the thyroepiglottic muscle

Details
- Nerve: Recurrent laryngeal nerve

Identifiers
- Latin: pars thyreoepiglottica musculi thyreoarytaenoidei
- TA98: A06.2.08.009
- TA2: 2201
- FMA: 46594

A considerable number of the fibers of the thyroarytenoid muscle are prolonged into the aryepiglottic fold, where some of them become lost, while others continue to the margin of the epiglottis. They have received a distinctive name, thyroepiglotticus or thyroepiglottic muscle, and are sometimes described as a separate muscle. This muscle's function is to widen the laryngeal inlet.
