= Quadrangular membrane =

Anatomical term for specific tissue in the throat

Larynx: Quadrangular membrane
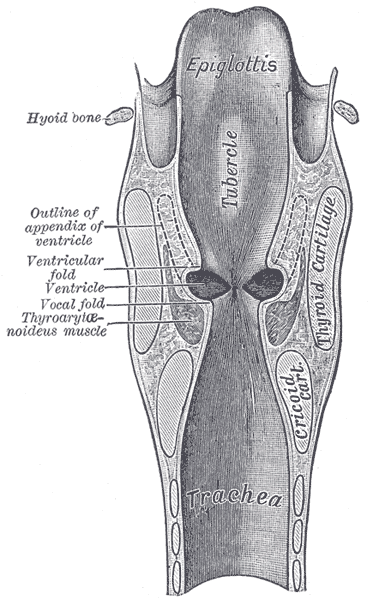
- The quadrangular membrane runs from the aryepiglottic fold to the vestibular ligament.

Details

Identifiers
- Latin: membrana quadrangularis
- TA98: A06.2.09.022
- TA2: 1658
- FMA: 55247

The quadrangular membrane is a layer of submucosa. It extends between the lateral margin of the epiglottis, and the apex and fovea triangularis of the ipsilateral arytenoid cartilage. It has free superior and inferior borders.

== Anatomy ==
The free superior border inclines posteriorly, forming the aryepiglottic ligament (the central component of the aryepiglottic fold within which the cuneiform cartilages are contained). Posteriorly, it contributes to the formation of the median corniculopharyngeal ligament.

The free inferior border forms the vestibular ligament (which together with the overlying mucosa constitutes the vestibular fold). The lower fibres of the quadrangular ligament condense to form the false vocal cords or the vestibular fold, while the upper fibres of the cricovocal ligaments condense to form the true vocal cord. The superior border is in the aryepiglottic fold.
