= Temporal gyrus =

Temporal gyrus may refer to:

- inferior temporal gyrus
- middle temporal gyrus
- superior temporal gyrus
- transverse temporal gyrus
