= Inferior horn =

Inferior horn can refer to:

- Inferior horn of thyroid cartilage
- Inferior horn of lateral ventricle
