= Pectineal =

Pectineal may refer to:

- Musculi pectinati of the heart, also known as pectinate muscles
- Pectineus muscle, an adductor of the thigh
- Pectineal line (femur)
- Pectineal line (pubis), also known as the pecten pubis
- Pectineal ligament, or Cooper's Ligament, located along the pecten pubis
