= Cuneate =

Cuneate means "wedge-shaped", and can apply to:

- Cuneate leaf, a leaf shape
- Cuneate nucleus, a part of the brainstem
- Cuneate fasciculus, a tract from the spinal cord into the brainstem
