= Celiac =

Celiac (or coeliac in British English) may refer to:

- Coeliac disease
- Celiac artery
- Celiac lymph nodes
- Celiac plexus
