= Canaliculus =

In anatomy, a canaliculus is a small passageway.

Examples include:

- Two functionally different structures in bone:
  - Bone canaliculus, a small channel found in ossified bone for nutrition for example in the Haversian canal
  - A small canal (anatomy) in bone which carries some structure (such as a nerve) through it
- Canaliculus (parietal cell), an adaptation found on gastric parietal cells
- The lacrimal canaliculi, several small ducts in the eye
- The dental canaliculi, the blood supply within a tooth
- Bile canaliculi, where the bile produced by the hepatocytes is drained
- Inferior tympanic canaliculus, the passage for the tympanic branch of the glossopharyngeal nerve and inferior tympanic artery
- Foramen petrosum (canaliculus innominatus), a small occasional opening in the greater wing of the sphenoid bone
