= Pedicle =

Pedicle or pedicel may refer to:

== Human anatomy ==
- Pedicle of vertebral arch, the segment between the transverse process and the vertebral body, and is often used as a radiographic marker and entry point in vertebroplasty and kyphoplasty procedures
- Pedicle of a skin flap (medicine)
- Hilum of kidney, also called the renal pedicle
- Pedicel, a foot process of some cells

== Non-human anatomy ==
- Pedicle in brachiopods, a fleshy line used to attach and anchor brachiopods and some bivalve mollusks to a substrate
- Pedicle (cervidae), the attachment point for antlers in cervids
- Pedicel (antenna), the second segment of the antenna in the class Insecta, where the Johnston's organ is found
- Pedicel or Petiole (insect anatomy), the stem formed by a restricted abdominal segment which connects the thorax with the gaster (the remaining abdominal segments) in the suborder Apocrita
- Pedicel (spider), the narrow segment connecting the cephalothorax with the abdomen

== Other ==
- Pedicel (botany), the stalk of an individual flower
- Congo Pedicle, an area of DR Congo jutting into Zambia
- Zaire Pedicle, used for 'Congo Pedicle' during the time that DR Congo was called Zaire
- Congo Pedicle road, serving Zambian provinces either side of the Congo Pedicle
