= Geniculum =

Angular knee-like structure

A geniculum is a small genu, or angular knee-like structure. The term is often used in anatomical nomenclature to designate a sharp knee-like bend in a small structure or organ.

For example, in the facial canal, the genicular ganglion is situated on the geniculum of the facial nerve, the point where the nerve changes its direction.
