= Azygos =

Azygos (impar), from the Greek άζυξ, refers to an anatomical structure that is unpaired. This is relatively unusual, as most elements of anatomy reflect bilateral symmetry. Azygos may refer to:

- Azygos anterior cerebral artery
- Azygos artery of vagina
- Azygos lobe
- Azygos vein
- Ganglion impar
