= Simian shelf =

The simian shelf is a bony thickening on the front of the ape mandible. Its function is to reinforce the jaw, though it also has the effect of considerably reducing the movement of the tongue by restricting the area available for muscles.

Humans are the only primates to have protruding chins, though some fossils of early humans show evidence of a simian shelf.

== Evolution of the simian shelf ==
In Maboko Island (1988), the lower jaw of a Kenyapithecus was found, and it provides signs of the simian shelf evolution in modern apes. Where the simian shelf is present, the bottom teeth will be leaning forward. This happened to be a unique feature of the Kenyapithecus leading there to be a link between the two. This sign of evolution was identified as shown through the lower incisors that lean forward and are known to be used to break hard objects. The lower incisors were concluded to be an adaptive feature as it was an adaptation for "hard object feeding including... large mandible... and upper incisors". Although the forward leaning lower incisors began to show up less in apes, the simian shelf still remained: "[it] was retained by most large bodied genera and served as a preadaptation for the evolution of broad lower incisors in living great apes". The simian shelf found in chimpanzees is not found in modern humans. It was found in a study that the human chin has no true purpose because the simian shelf in chimpanzees is to protect the jaw from the stress of eating and/or chewing. The human speech mechanism also played a role in the evolution or disappearance of the simian shelf. Changes in the jaw such as "widening of the mandibular arch, loss of the simian shelf, and development of the chin" allowed for the development of the speech mechanism. This suggests that the simian shelf was no longer found in modern humans due to the changes that occurred due to the development of speech.

== Study: "Fetal and infant growth patterns of the mandibular symphysis in modern humans and chimpanzees" ==
There is a study published by Michael Coquerelle, et al. that targets the study of the mandibular symphysis in the fetal and infant growth of chimpanzees. The mandibular symphysis consists of the external portion of the mandible, and the symphysis refers to the line seen between the two bones found in the middle of the mandible that appear during the fetal and infant stages. In the fetal chimpanzees, the study showed that the mandibular symphysis is "anteriorly inclined". It then begins to have "an increasingly vertical orientation up until birth". The study has shown that the shiftings that occur are due to the simian shelf becoming repositioned. The shifting that occurs with the simian shelf may show that "the suprahyoid muscles have a significant influence on the anterior growth of the symphysis". The mandibular symphysis in this case is also compared to that of the fetal and infant humans. As stated in the study, both, the human and chimpanzee, start out with a v-shaped mandible during the fetal stages, but the chimpanzee mandible remains in that v-shape leading to the development of the simian shelf. The forming of the simian shelf occurs due to the "basal symphysis [being] modified" as a result of the v-shape being maintained past the fetal stage.
