= Coronoid process =

Coronoid process (from Greek korone, 'like a crown') may refer to:

- Coronoid process of the mandible, part of the ramus mandibulae of the mandible
- Coronoid process of the ulna, a triangular eminence projecting forward from the upper and front part of the ulna
