= Middle superior alveolar artery =

Details

Identifiers
- Latin: arteria alveolaris superior media

The middle superior alveolar artery is an inconstant artery supplying the upper jaw. It is one of the three superior alveolar arteries. When present, it arises from the infraorbital artery and descends upon the lateral wall of the maxillary sinus, forming anastomotic arcades with the other two superior alveolar arteries of the same side before ending near the canine tooth. It contributes to the arterial supply to the upper/maxillary incisor and canine teeth.
