= Lumbrical =

Lumbrical may refer to:

- Lumbricals of the hand
- Lumbricals of the foot
