= Cricoarytenoid =

Cricoarytenoid may refer to:

- Cricoarytenoid joint, part of the larynx
- Cricoarytenoid ligament, part of the larynx
- Cricoarytenoid muscle, part of the larynx. More specifically:
  - Lateral cricoarytenoid muscle
  - Posterior cricoarytenoid muscle
