= Rima vestibuli =

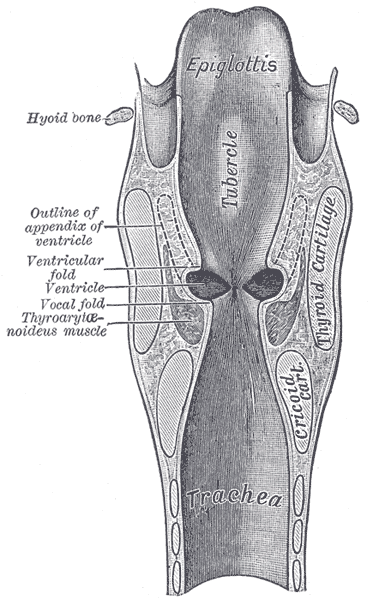
- Coronal section of larynx and upper part of trachea (rima vestibuli visible but not labeled)

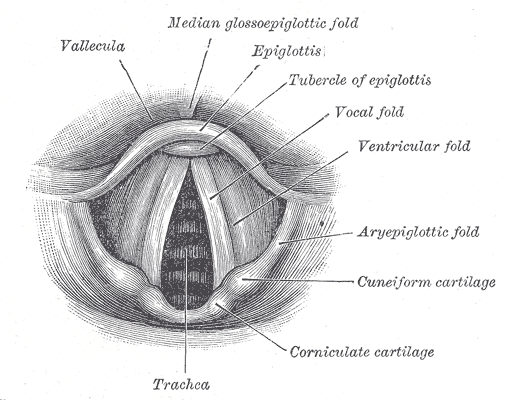
- The entrance to the larynx

Identifiers
- TA98: A06.2.09.009
- TA2: 3205
- FMA: 55473

The rima vestibuli is a space in the laryngeal cavity.

It is to the vestibular ligaments (vestibular folds once covered with mucous membrane) what the rima glottidis is to the vocal ligaments (vocal folds once covered with mucous membrane) – the space formed when the folds are separated. It can be defined as the space in between the false vocal cords, and allows air to pass through the larynx.

== See also ==
- Rima glottidis
