= Oblique arytenoid =

Intrinsic muscle of larynx

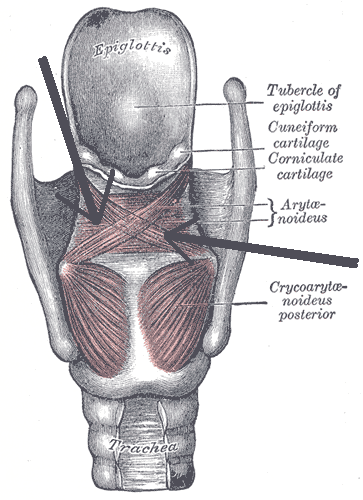
- Muscles of larynx. Posterior view. Oblique arytenoid: The "X" in the center. Transverse arytenoid: Bands underneath the "X". Aryepiglotticus: Wraps around back.

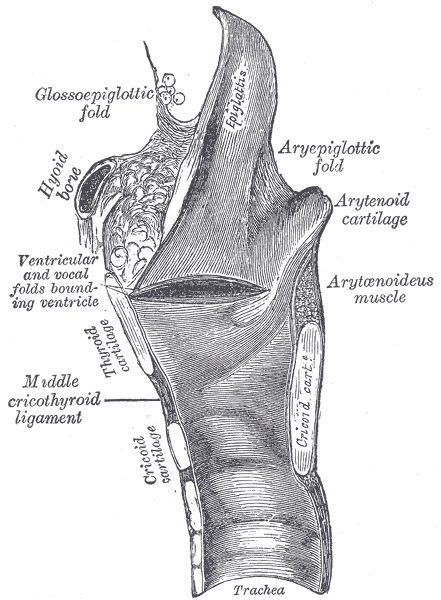
- Sagittal section of the larynx and upper part of the trachea. (Arytenoideus visible at center right.)

Details
- Origin: Posterior surface of muscular process of arytenoid cartilage
- Insertion: Posterior surface of apex of adjacent arytenoid cartilage; extends into aryepiglottic fold
- Nerve: recurrent laryngeal branch of vagus nerve [X]
- Actions: Sphincter of the laryngeal inlet

Identifiers
- Latin: musculus arytenoideus obliquus
- TA98: A06.2.08.010
- TA2: 2203
- FMA: 46583

The oblique arytenoid is bilaterally paired intrinsic muscle of the larynx. It is superficial to the transverse arytenoid; the oblique and transverse arytenoids are often considered two parts of a single muscle - the interarytenoid muscle (which is then said to have an oblique part and a transverse part).

Each oblique arytenoid muscle attaches to both arytenoid cartilages; the two oblique arytenoids thus cross each other.

Some muscle fibres of the oblique arytenoid muscle proceed to extend laterally around the apex of arythenoid cartilage into the aryepiglottic fold, thus forming the aryepiglottic muscle.

== Anatomy ==
=== Attachments ===
Each oblique arytenoid muscle attaches to the posterior aspect of the muscular process of arytenoid cartilage of one side, and to the apex of the arytenoid cartilage of the opposite side; the two oblique arytenoid muscles thus cross each other obliquely.

=== Vasculature ===
Arterial supply is provided by laryngeal branches of superior thyroid arteries and inferior thyroid arteries.

=== Innervation ===
The muscle receives motor innervation from the recurrent laryngeal nerve (a branch of the vagus nerve (CN X)) (as is the case with all intrinsic muscles of the larynx except the cricothyroid muscle).

== Function ==
Together with the aryepiglottic muscles, the two oblique arytenoid muscles function as a sphincter of the laryngeal inlet by adducting aryepiglottic folds, and approximating the arytenoid cartilages and the tubercle of epiglottis.

The muscles act during swallowing or coughing.
