= Transverse arytenoid =

Muscle in the larynx

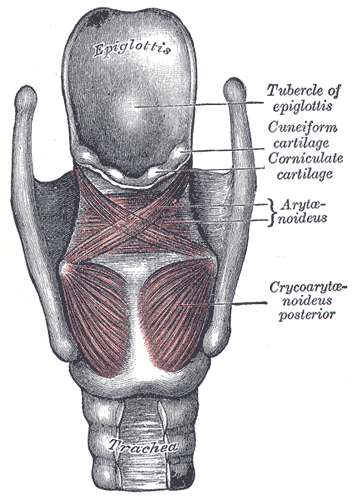
- Transverse arytenoid is readily seen but not labeled (it is indicated by the lower line of "Arytaenoideus" label)

Identifiers
- TA98: A06.2.08.012
- TA2: 2205
- FMA: 46582

The transverse arytenoid is an unpaired intrinsic muscle of the larynx. It is situated deep to the two oblique arytenoids; the oblique and transverse arytenoids are often considered two parts of a single muscle - the interarytenoid (arytenoid) muscle (which is then said to have an oblique part and a transverse part).

The transverse arytenoid bridges the gap between the two arytenoid cartilage in the larynx, occupying the concavity of the lateral surface of each cartilage.

== Anatomy ==
=== Attachments ===
The muscle attaches to both arytenoid cartilages, attaching onto each cartilage at the posterior aspect of its muscular process and the adjacent lateral border of the cartilage.

=== Innervation ===
The muscle receives motor innervation from the two recurrent laryngeal nerves (each being a branch of the ipsilateral vagus nerve (CN X)); the muscle also receives branches from the internal laryngeal branch, though the latter's contribution to the muscle's motor innervation is unclear.

== Function ==
The muscle approximates the two arytenoid cartilages to close the posterior (intercartilaginous) part of rima glottidis.
