= Aryepiglottic muscle =

Intrinsic muscle of the larynx

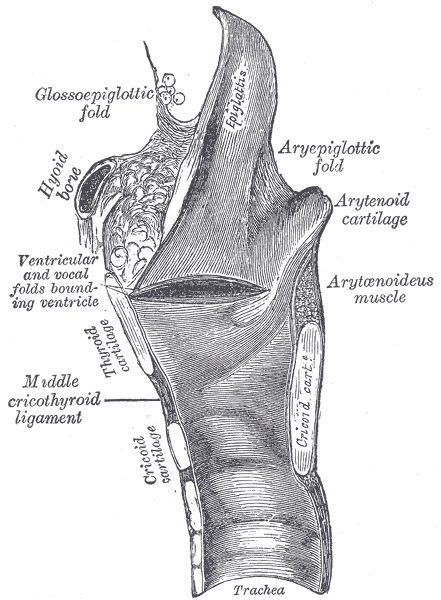
- Sagittal section of the larynx and upper part of the trachea (arytenoideus visible at center right)

Details
- Origin: Continuation of the oblique arytenoid past the arytenoid apex
- Insertion: Aryepiglottic fold
- Artery: Laryngeal branch of superior thyroid artery
- Nerve: Inferior laryngeal nerve (from the vagus nerve)
- Actions: Closes the laryngeal inlet

Identifiers
- Latin: pars aryepiglottica musculi arytaenoidei obliqui, musculus aryepiglotticus
- TA98: A06.2.08.011
- TA2: 2204
- FMA: 46602

The aryepiglottic muscle or aryepiglotticus muscle, often considered the aryepiglottic part of oblique arytenoid muscle, is an intrinsic muscle of the larynx. It is a direct continuation of a portion of the fibers of the oblique arytenoid muscle, sharing its innervation and blood supply, after these select fibers travel laterally around the arytenoid apex to the aryepiglottic fold.

The aryepiglottic muscle is innervated by the inferior laryngeal nerve, a branch of the recurrent laryngeal nerve (itself a branch of the vagus nerve). Together with the oblique arytenoid muscle, it helps to act as a sphincter and weak adductor of the laryngeal inlet.

== Additional images ==
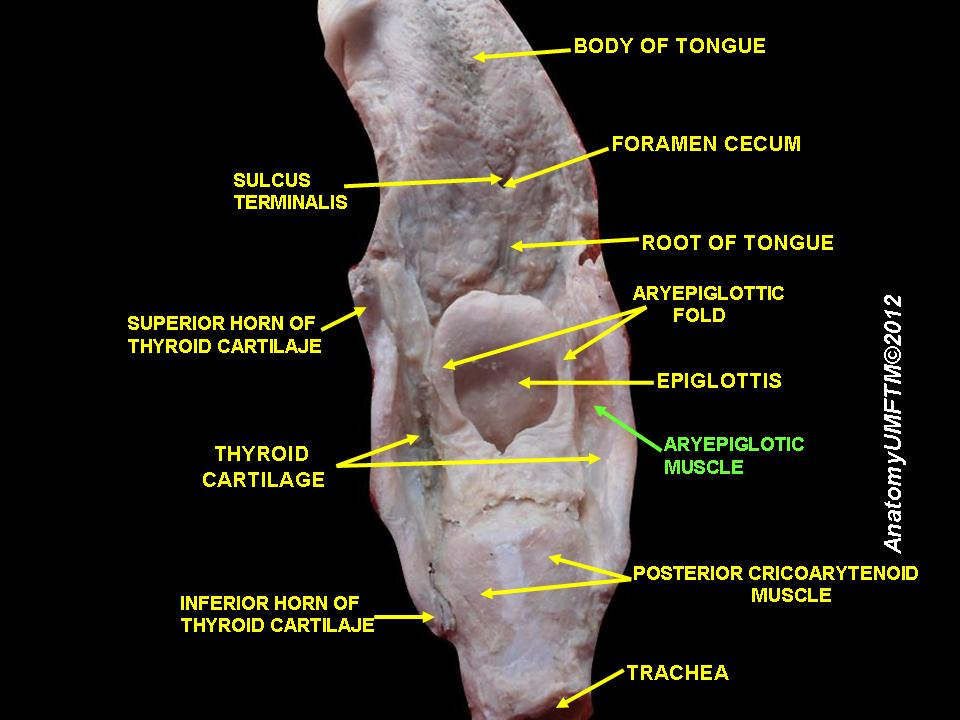
Aryepiglottic muscle

== See also ==
- Vestibular folds
