= Whisper triangle =

The Whispering Triangle is an opening in the larynx which allows air to pass from the lungs to the mouth even though the vocal folds are adducted (i.e. closed). It is opened if the back part of the Arytenoid cartilage is pulled apart while the front part is close together in order to facilitate closed vocal folds. Because the opening of the Whisper Triangle is quite small, air rushing through it creates turbulence in the air stream, which can be perceived as acoustic noise. This noise is used for the production of vowels in (unvoiced) whispering.
