= Cuneiform cartilages =

Type of cartilage in the human larynx

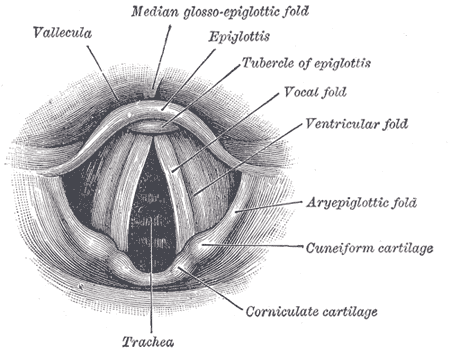
- Laryngoscopic view of interior of larynx.

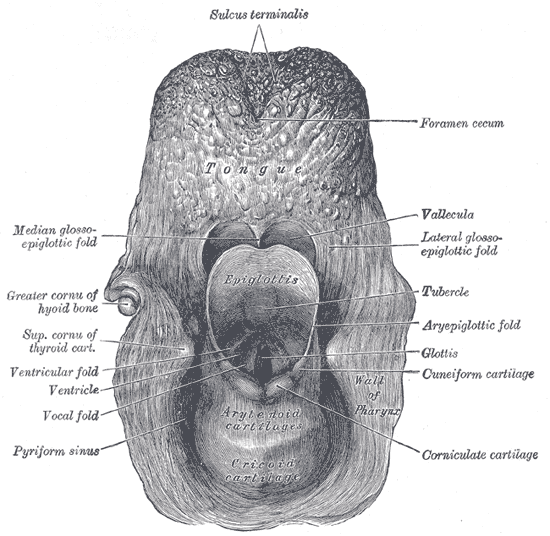
- The entrance to the larynx, viewed from behind.

Details

Identifiers
- Latin: cartilagines cuneiformes
- TA98: A06.2.06.001
- TA2: 998
- FMA: 55111

In the human larynx, the cuneiform cartilages (from Latin: cuneus 'wedge' + forma 'form'; also known as cartilages of Wrisberg) are two small, elongated pieces of yellow elastic cartilage, placed one on either side, in the aryepiglottic fold.

The cuneiforms are paired cartilages that sit on top of and move with the arytenoids. They are located above and in front of the corniculate cartilages, and the presence of these two pairs of cartilages result in small bulges on the surface of the mucous membrane, i.e. cuneiform tubercle. Covered by the aryepiglottic folds, the cuneiforms form the lateral aspect of the laryngeal inlet, while the corniculates form the posterior aspect, and the epiglottis the anterior.

Function of the cuneiform cartilages is to support the vocal folds and lateral aspects of the epiglottis. They also provide a degree of solidity to the folds in which they are embedded.

== Additional images ==
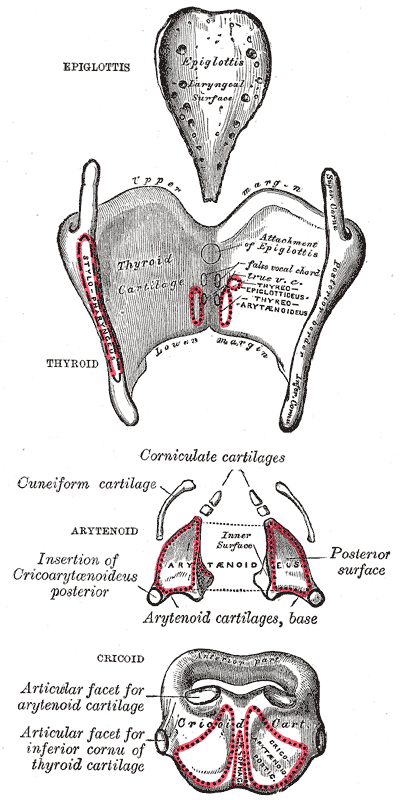
Posterior view of the cartilages of the larynx

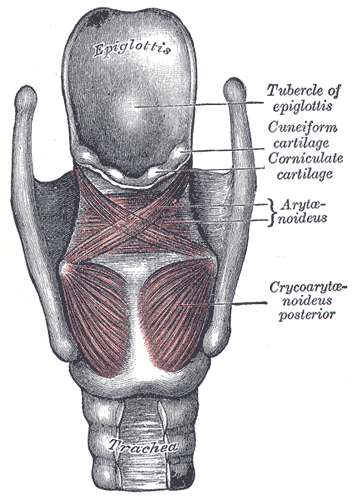
Posterior view of the muscles of the larynx
