= Cricoarytenoid muscle =

Muscle of the larynx

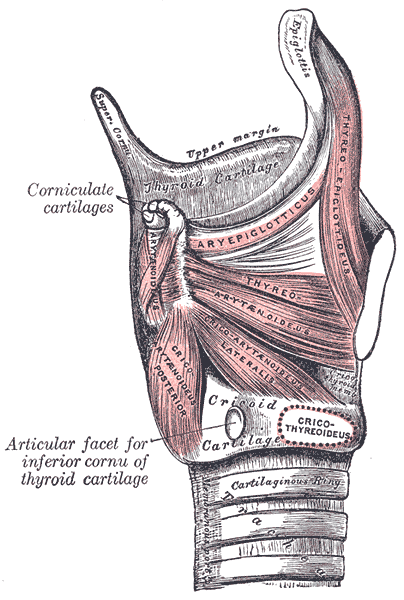
- Muscles of larynx. Side view. Right lamina of thyroid cartilage removed.

Details
- Nerve: Recurrent laryngeal nerve

Identifiers
- Latin: musculus cricoarytenoideus

Cricoarytenoid muscles are muscles that connect the cricoid cartilage and arytenoid cartilage.

More specifically, it can refer to:

- Posterior cricoarytenoid muscle
- Lateral cricoarytenoid muscle
