= Arytenoid =

Arytenoid can refer to:

- Arytenoid cartilage, part of the larynx
- Arytenoid muscle, part of the larynx
