= Lateral cricoarytenoid muscle =

Muscle of the larynx

Lateral cricoarytenoid
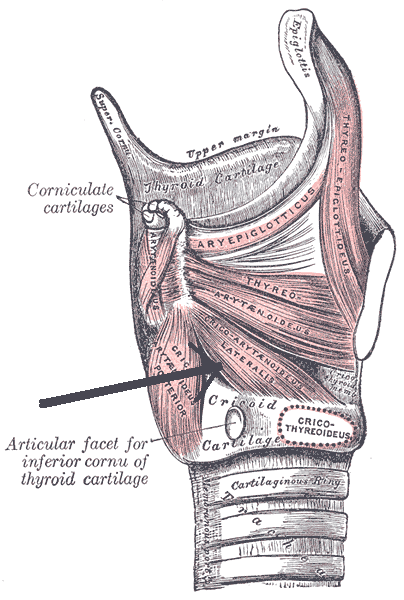
- Muscles of larynx. Side view. Right lamina of thyroid cartilage removed.

Details
- Origin: Lateral part of the arch of the cricoid
- Insertion: Muscular process of the arytenoid cartilage
- Nerve: Recurrent laryngeal branch of the vagus
- Actions: Adduct and medially rotate the cartilage, pulling the vocal ligaments towards the midline and backwards and so closing off the rima glottidis
- Antagonist: Posterior cricoarytenoid muscle

Identifiers
- Latin: musculus cricoarytaenoideus lateralis
- TA98: A06.2.08.006
- TA2: 2198
- FMA: 46579

The lateral cricoarytenoid (also anterior cricoarytenoid) is an intrinsic muscle of the larynx. It attaches at the cricoid cartilage anteriorly, and at the arytenoid cartilage of the same side posteriorly. It is innervated by the recurrent laryngeal nerve. It acts to close the rima glottidis, thus closing the airway.

== Anatomy ==
The muscle is directed obliquely superoposteriorly from its anterior attachment to its posterior attachment.

=== Attachments ===
The muscle's anterior attachment is onto the superior border of the arch of the cricoid cartilage.

Its posterior attachment is onto the anterior aspect of the muscular process of the ipsilateral arytenoid cartilage.

=== Innervation ===
The muscle receives motor innervation from (branches of the anterior terminal division of) the recurrent laryngeal nerve (which is in turn a branch of a vagus nerve (CN X)).

=== Actions/movements ===
The muscle rotates the arytenoid cartilage medially (it thus acts as antagonist to the posterior cricoarytenoid muscle which rotates the cartilage laterally).

== Function ==
The muscle closes the rima glottidis, adducting (approximating) the apices of the vocal process to close the ligamentous part of rima glottidis (in which it is synergystic with the oblique arytenoid muscles and transverse arytenoid muscle). It thus functions to close the airway.

It also shortens and slackens the vocal cords.

== Additional images ==
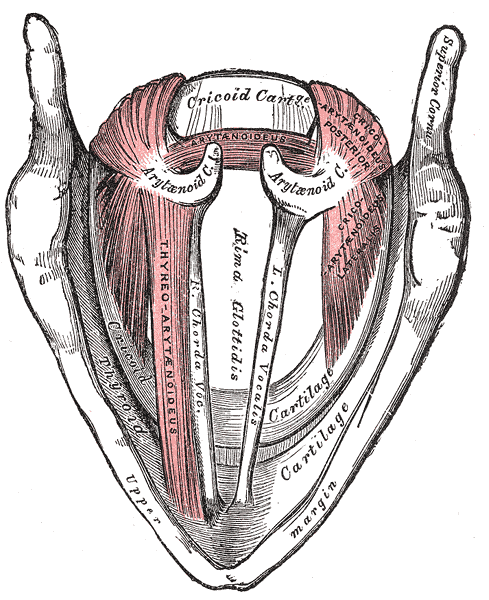
Muscles of the larynx, seen from above.

== See also ==
- Cricoid cartilage
- Arytenoid cartilage
