= Cuneiform (disambiguation) =

Cuneiform is an ancient writing system originating in Mesopotamia.

Cuneiform (from the Latin word for "wedge-shaped") may also refer to:

- Cuneiform bones, in the human foot
- Cuneiform cartilages, in the human larynx
- Cuneiform Records, a music record label
- CuneiForm (software), an optical character recognition tool
- Cuneiform (Unicode block)
- Cuneiform (programming language)
