= Vestibular fold =

Part of the larynx

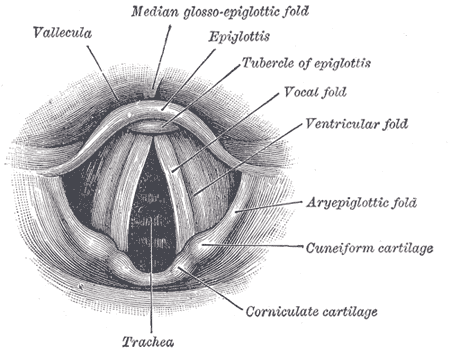
- Laryngoscopic view of the vocal folds. (Vestibular fold labeled at center right.)

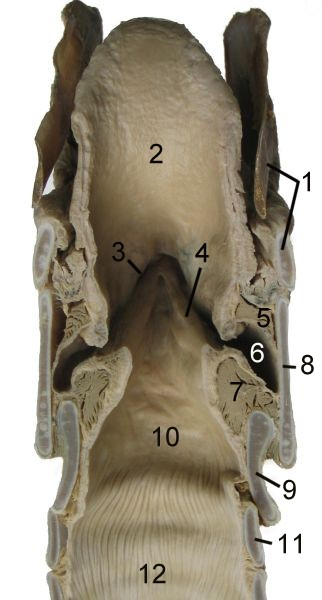
- Cut through the larynx of a horse: 1 hyoid bone 2 epiglottis 3 vestibular fold, false vocal fold/cord, (Plica vestibularis) 4 vocal fold, true vocal fold, (Plica vocalis) 5 Musculus ventricularis 6 ventricle of larynx (Ventriculus laryngis) 7 Musculus vocalis 8 Adam's apple (thyroid cartilage) 9 rings of cartilage (cricoid cartilage) 10 Cavum infraglotticum 11 first tracheal cartilage 12 Windpipe (Trachea)

Details

Identifiers
- Latin: plica vestibularis, plica ventricularis
- TA98: A06.2.09.008
- TA2: 3196
- FMA: 55452

The vestibular fold (ventricular fold, superior or false vocal cord) is one of two thick folds of mucous membrane, each enclosing a narrow band of fibrous tissue, the vestibular ligament, which is attached in front to the angle of the thyroid cartilage immediately below the attachment of the epiglottis, and behind to the antero-lateral surface of the arytenoid cartilage, a short distance above the vocal process.

The lower border of this ligament, enclosed in mucous membrane, forms a free crescentic margin, which constitutes the upper boundary of the ventricle of the larynx.

They are lined with respiratory epithelium, while true vocal cords have stratified squamous epithelium.

== Function ==
The vestibular folds of the larynx play a significant role in the maintenance of the laryngeal functions of breathing and preventing food and drink from entering the airway during swallowing. They aid phonation (speech) by suppressing dysphonia. In some ethnic singing and chanting styles, such as in Tuva, Sardinia, Mongolia, South Africa, and Tibet (...) the vestibular folds may be used in co-oscillation with the vocal folds, producing very low or high pitched sounds (most of the time, one octave higher). Conversely, people who have had their epiglottis removed because of cancer do not choke any more than when it was present.

== Society and culture ==
They have a minimal role in normal phonation, but are often used to produce deep sonorous tones in Tuvan throat singing, as well as in musical screaming and the death growl singing style used in various forms of metal. Simultaneous voicing with the vocal and vestibular folds is diplophonia. Some voice actors occasionally employ small amounts of this phonation for its dark, growling quality while portraying a "villainous" or antagonistic voice.

== See also ==
- Vocal folds
- Aryepiglottic folds
- Larynx
