= Rima glottidis =

Opening between the true vocal cords and the arytenoid cartilages of the larynx

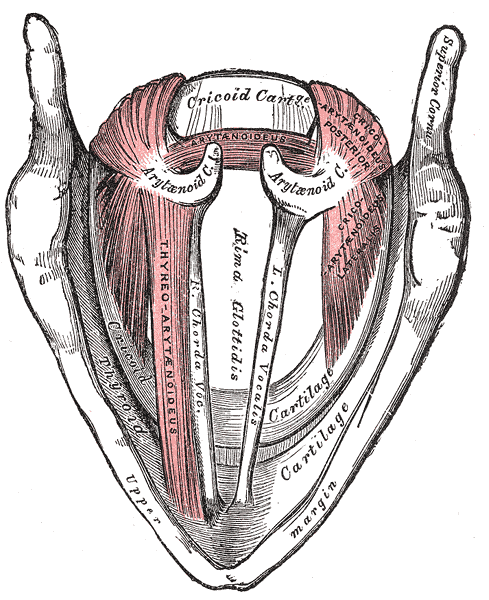
- Muscles of the larynx, seen from above

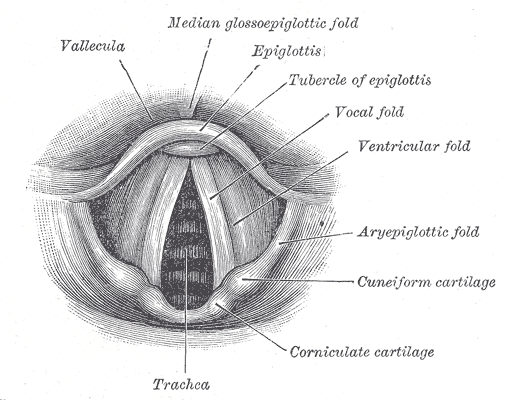
- The entrance to the larynx.

Details

Identifiers
- Latin: rima glottidis
- TA98: A06.2.09.014
- TA2: 3208
- FMA: 55472

The rima glottidis is the opening between the two true vocal cords anteriorly, and the two arytenoid cartilages posteriorly. It is part of the larynx.

== Anatomy ==
The rima glottidis is the narrowest part of larynx. It is longer (~23 mm) in males than in females (17–18 mm).

The rima glottidis is an aperture between the two true vocal cords anteriorly, and the bases and vocal process of the two arytenoid cartilages posteriorly. It is therefore described as subdivided into two parts: the larger anterior part between the vocal folds (intermembranous part, or glottis vocalis), and the smaller posterior part between arytenoid cartilages (intercartilaginous part, glottis respiratoria, intercartilaginous glottis, respiratory glottis, or interarytenoid space). It is limited posteriorly by an interarytenoid fold of mucous membrane.

== Function ==
The rima glottidis is closed by the lateral cricoarytenoid muscles and the arytenoid muscle, and opened by the posterior cricoarytenoid muscles. All of these muscles receive innervation from the recurrent laryngeal nerve which is a branch of the vagus nerve (CN X).

The shape of rima glottidis is changed by movements of vocal cords and arytenoid cartilages during respiration and phonation.

== Clinical significance ==
Any damage to the rima glottidis may result in a hoarse voice, aphonia or difficulty breathing.
