= Nerve of Wrisberg =

The nerve of Wrisberg (named for Heinrich August Wrisberg) can refer to:

- Medial cutaneous nerve of arm
- A branch of the facial nerve, also called nervus intermedius
