= Presbylarynx =

- Specialty: Otorhinolaryngology

Presbylarynx is a condition where age-related atrophy of the soft tissues of the larynx results in a weak voice and restricted vocal range and stamina. In other words, it is the loss of vocal fold tone and elasticity due to aging.

== Symptoms ==
The list of signs and symptoms mentioned in various sources for presbylarynx includes the 4 symptoms listed below:

1. Hoarseness
2. Breathy voice
3. Reduced voice volume
4. Unstable voice pitch

Note that presbylarynx symptoms usually refer to various symptoms known to a patient, but the phrase "presbylarynx signs" may refer to those signs only noticeable by a doctor.

== Treatment ==
The list of treatments mentioned in various sources for presbylarynx includes the following list. Always seek professional medical advice about any treatment or change in treatment plans.

- Voice therapy

== See also ==
- Acoustic phonetics
- Epiglottitis
- Intubation
- Laryngitis
- Mechanical larynx
- Phonation
- Phonetics
- Vocology
- Voice organ
