= Cricoarytenoid joint =

Joint of the larynx

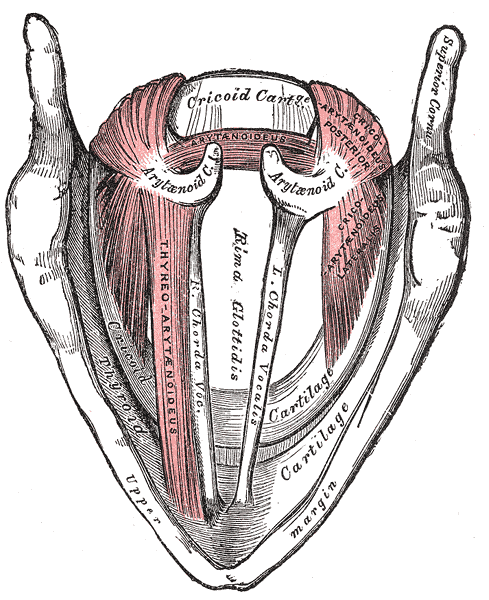
- Muscles of the larynx, seen from above.

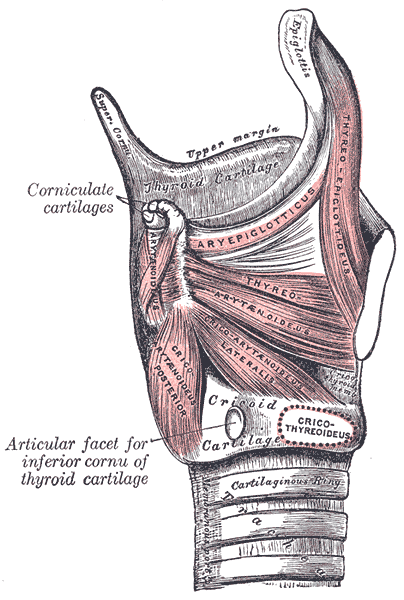
- Muscles of larynx. Side view. Right lamina of thyroid cartilage removed.

Details
- System: larynx

Identifiers
- Latin: articulatio cricoarytaenoidea
- TA98: A06.2.04.014
- TA2: 1667
- FMA: 55102

The cricoarytenoid joint is a joint connecting the cricoid cartilage and the arytenoid cartilage. It is a very shallow ball-and-socket joint. It allows for rotation and gliding motion. This controls the abduction and adduction of the vocal cords.

== Structure ==
The cricoarytenoid joint is a very shallow ball-and-socket joint.

== Function ==
The cricoarytenoid joint allows for rotation and gliding motion. The extent of rotation is significant, while the extent of gliding is limited.

The cricoarytenoid joint controls the abduction and adduction of the vocal cords. It is moved by many of the intrinsic muscles of the larynx.

== History ==
The cricoarytenoid joint was first described by Galen.

== See also ==
- Cricoarytenoid muscle
