= Aryepiglottic fold =

Folds near the larynx

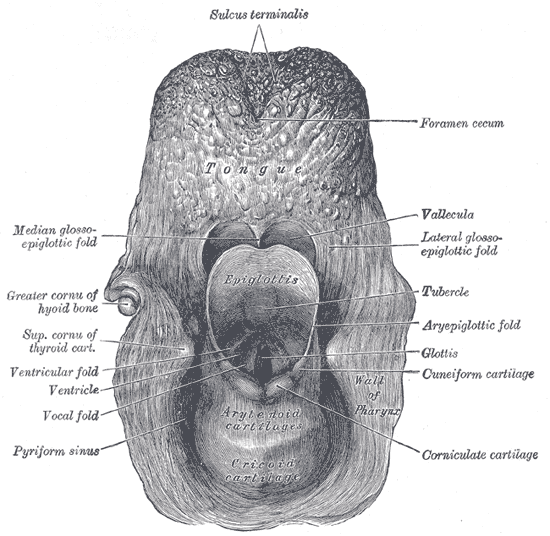
- The entrance to the larynx, viewed from behind (aryepiglottic fold labeled at center right)

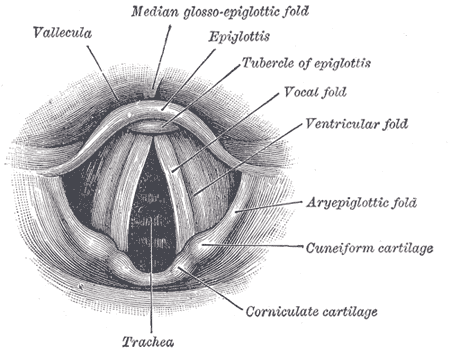
- Laryngoscopic view of interior of larynx (aryepiglottic fold labeled at center right)

Details
- System: Larynx

Identifiers
- Latin: plica aryepiglottica
- TA98: A06.2.09.003
- TA2: 3193
- FMA: 55448

The aryepiglottic folds are triangular folds of mucous membrane of the larynx. They enclose ligamentous and muscular fibres. They extend from the lateral borders of the epiglottis to the arytenoid cartilages, hence the name 'aryepiglottic'. They contain the aryepiglottic muscles and form the upper borders of the quadrangular membrane. They have a role in growling as a form of phonation. They may be narrowed and cause stridor, or be shortened and cause laryngomalacia.

== Structure ==
The aryepiglottic folds are triangular. They are narrow in front, wide behind, and slope obliquely downward and backward. They originate from the lateral borders of the epiglottis. They insert into the arytenoid cartilages.

In front, they are bounded by the epiglottis. Behind, they are bounded by the apices of the arytenoid cartilages, the corniculate cartilages, and the interarytenoid notch. Within the posterior part of each aryepiglottic fold exists a cuneiform cartilage which forms a whitish prominence, the cuneiform tubercle.

The aryepiglottic folds contain the aryepiglottic muscles. They form the upper borders of the quadrangular membrane, and the lateral borders of the laryngeal inlet.

== Function ==
Phonation

Under certain circumstances, the aryepiglottic folds take part in phonation, for instance in the singing technique of vocal growl, such as practiced by Louis Armstrong and other jazz singers, as well as singers from different cultures and genres. The approximation of the aryepiglottic folds during vocalization may establish sustained co-oscillations, at relatively low frequencies, producing the growl or growling effect, as demonstrated by the pioneering work by Sakakibara, Fuks, Imagawa and Tayama. In some cases of screaming, the aryepiglottic folds may also be recruited

=== Clinical significance ===
Stridor

If the aryepiglottic folds narrow the laryngeal inlet, they may cause stridor.

Laryngomalacia

The aryepiglottic folds are shortened in laryngomalacia. They may be surgically removed to prevent problems eating and shortness of breath.

== Gallery ==
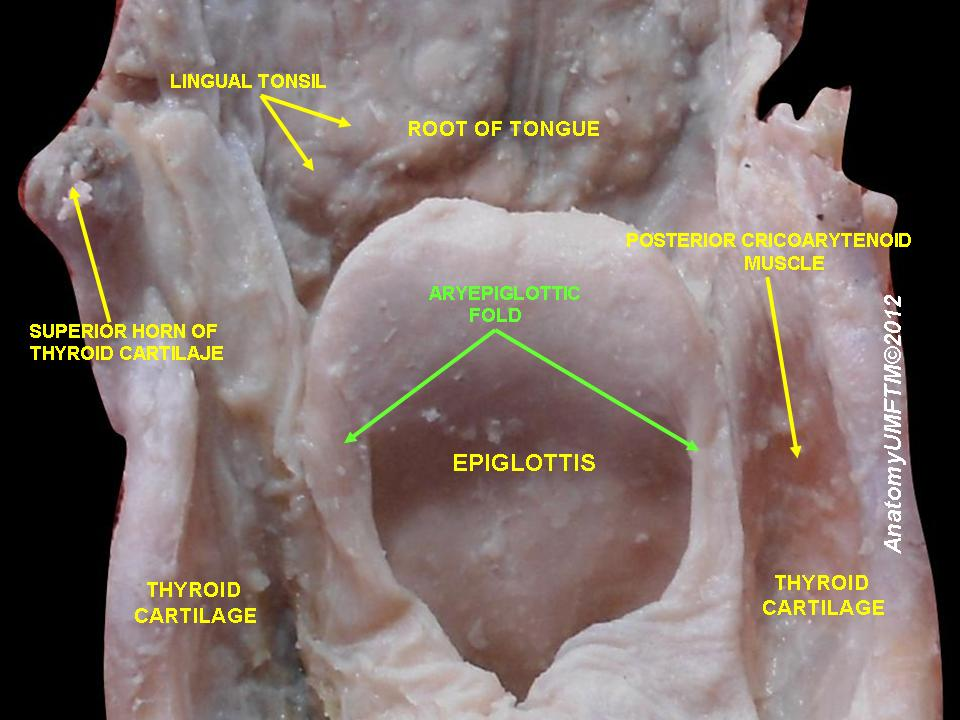
Aryepiglottic fold

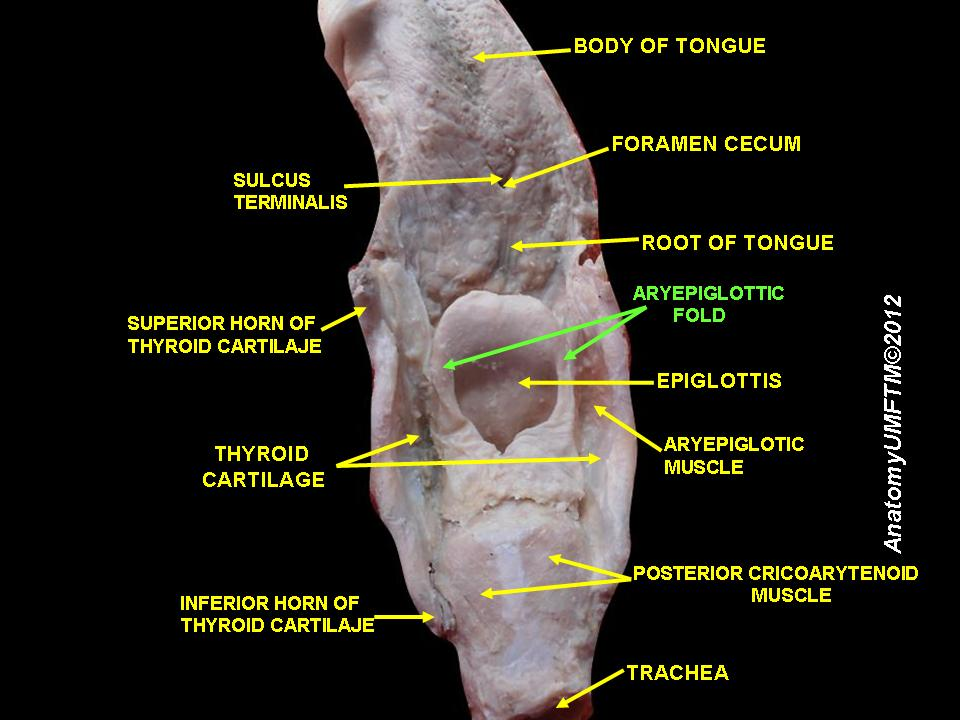
Aryepiglottic fold

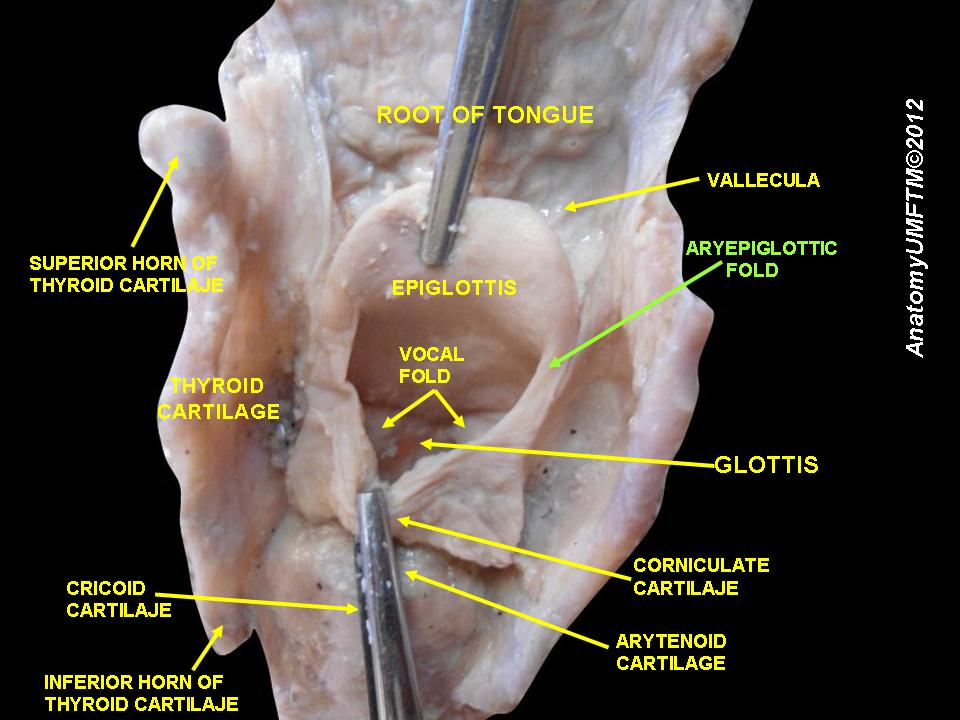
Aryepiglottic fold

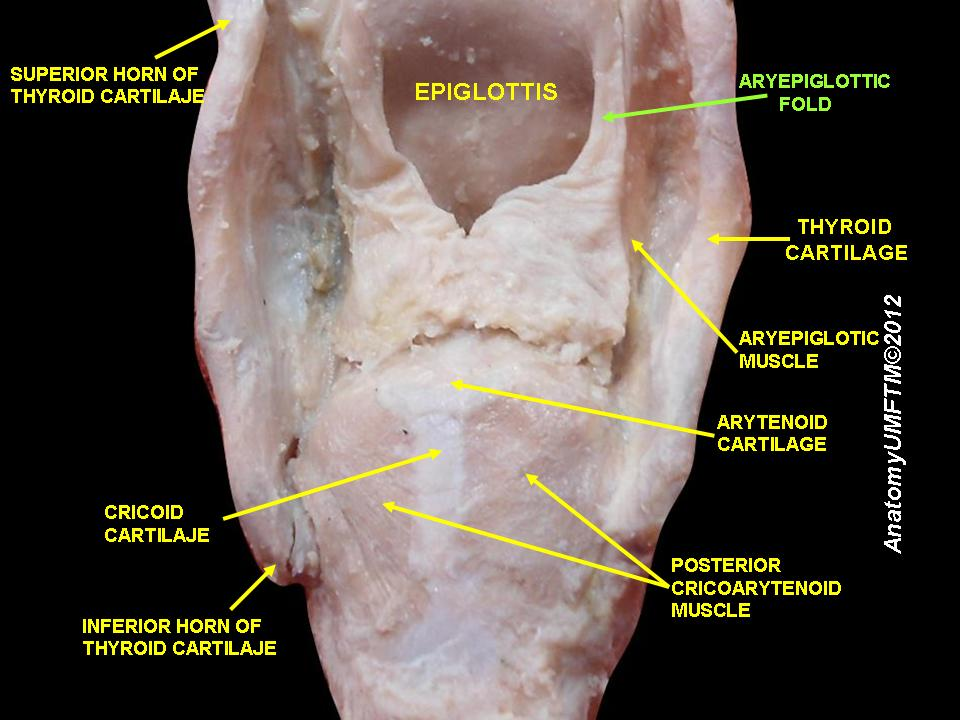
Aryepiglottic fold

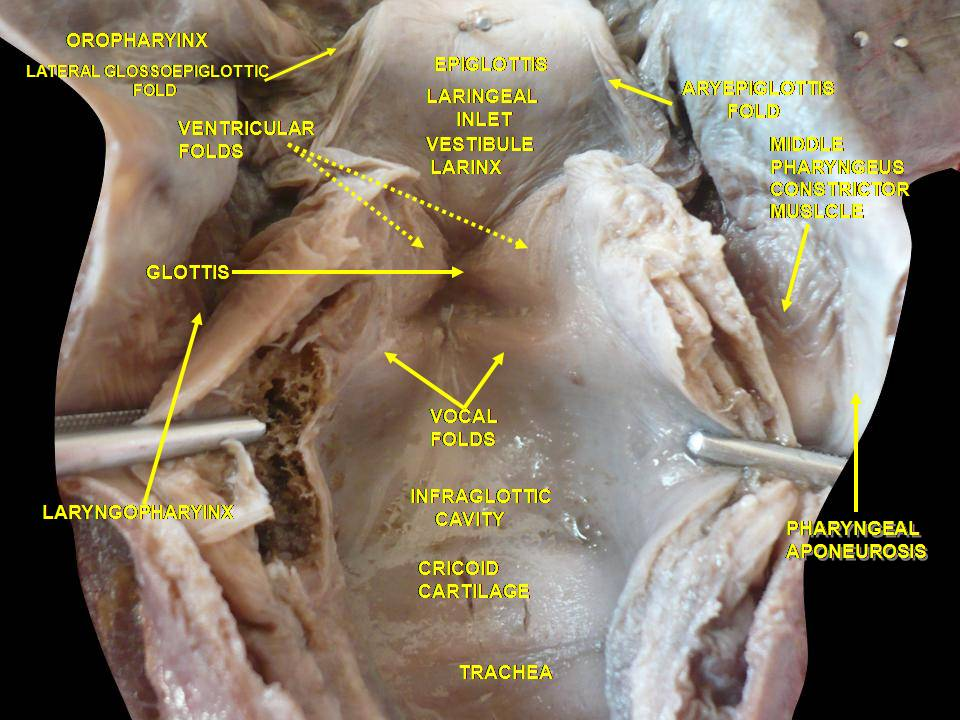
Deep dissection of larynx, pharynx and tongue seen from behind
