= Heinrich August Wrisberg =

18th-century German anatomist

Heinrich Wrisberg
- Heinrich August Wrisberg (1739-1808)
- Born: 20 June 1739; Sankt Andreasberg, Duchy of Brunswick-Lüneburg
- Died: 29 March 1808 (aged 68); Göttingen, Kingdom of Westphalia
- Education: University of Göttingen
- Known for: Wrisberg cartilages Wrisberg ganglion
- Scientific career
- Fields: Anatomist and gynaecologist
- Workplaces: University of Göttingen
- Doctoral students: Justus Christian Loder
- Other notable students: Christoph Wilhelm Hufeland

Heinrich August Wrisberg (20 June 1739 – 29 March 1808) was an anatomist. He also published under the Latinized version of his name as Henricus Augustus Wrisberg.

== Education ==
He obtained his MD in 1763 at the University of Göttingen with a thesis entitled: De Respiratione Prima Nervo Phrenico Et Calore Animali: Pavca Disserit Et Simvl Vicarias Anatomiam Profitendi Operas Ad Diem XXIV. Octobris Aperiendas Indicit.

== Career ==
He was a professor of medicine and obstetrics. Wrisberg studied the sympathetic nervous system and described the Wrisberg ganglion of the cardiac plexus. He also wrote a text on hernias.

The cuneiform cartilages are sometimes called the "Wrisberg cartilages".

There are two nerves known as the nerve of Wrisberg.
