= Cricoarytenoid ligament =

Ligament of the larynx

Details
- From: cricoid cartilage
- To: arytenoid cartilage

Identifiers
- Latin: ligamentum cricoarytaenoideum
- TA98: A06.2.04.016
- TA2: 1668
- FMA: 55261

The cricoarytenoid ligament extends from the lamina of the cricoid cartilage to the medial surface of the base and muscular process of the arytenoid cartilage.
