= Arytenoid muscle =

Muscle of the larynx

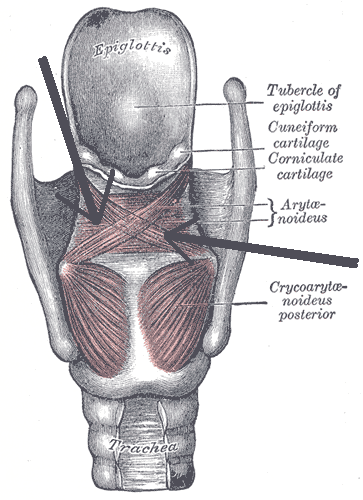
- Muscles of larynx. Posterior view. Oblique arytenoid: The "X" in the center. Transverse arytenoid: Bands underneath the "X". Aryepiglotticus: Wraps around back.

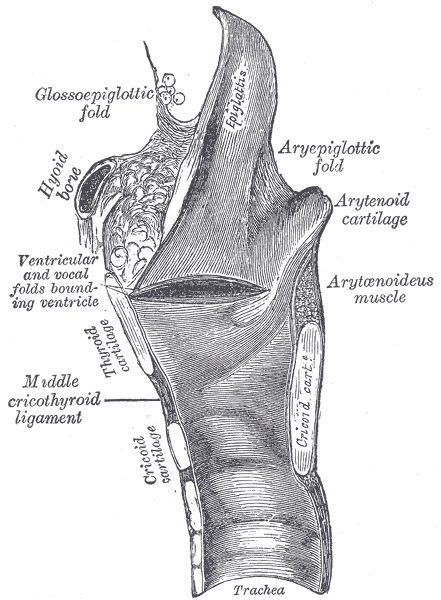
- Sagittal section of the larynx and upper part of the trachea. (Arytenoideus visible at center right.)

Details
- Origin: Arytenoid cartilage on one side
- Insertion: Arytenoid cartilage on opposite side
- Artery: Superior laryngeal artery
- Nerve: Recurrent laryngeal branch of the vagus
- Actions: Approximate the arytenoid cartilages (close rima glottis)

Identifiers
- Latin: musculus arytaenoideus

The arytenoid muscle /ærɪˈtiːnɔɪd/ or interarytenoid muscle is a composite intrinsic muscle of the larynx, consisting of a transverse part and an oblique part - the two parts may be considered as separate muscles: an unpaired transverse arytenoid muscle, and a bilaterally paired oblique arytenoid muscle.

The two constituent parts differ in their attachments, structure and actions. Both receive motor innervation from the recurrent laryngeal nerve(s) (each nerve being a branch of one vagus nerve (CN X)).

== Clinical significance ==
=== Electromyography ===
Function of the arytenoid muscle is a good method to determine function of the recurrent laryngeal nerve. Continuous electromyography of the arytenoid muscle can provide confidence to surgeons that the recurrent laryngeal nerve is not damaged during neck surgeries, such as thyroidectomy.

== Other animals ==
The arytenoid muscle is found in many animals, including dogs.

== Additional images ==
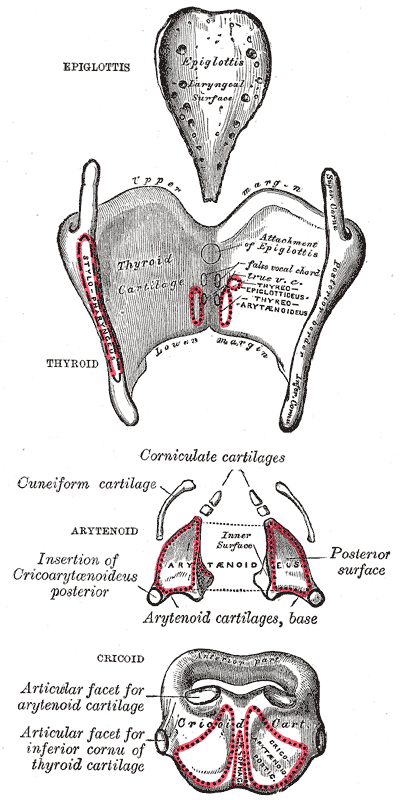
The cartilages of the larynx. Posterior view.

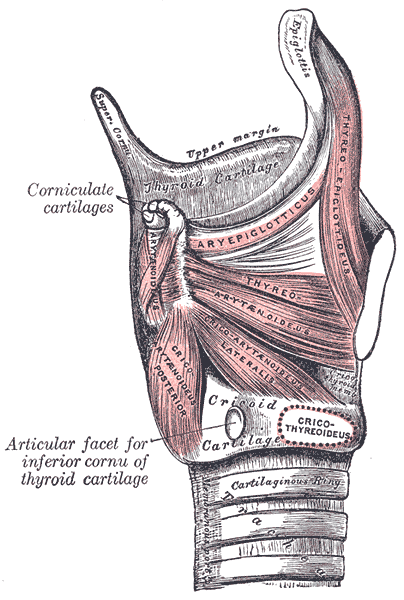
Muscles of larynx. Side view. Right lamina of thyroid cartilage removed.

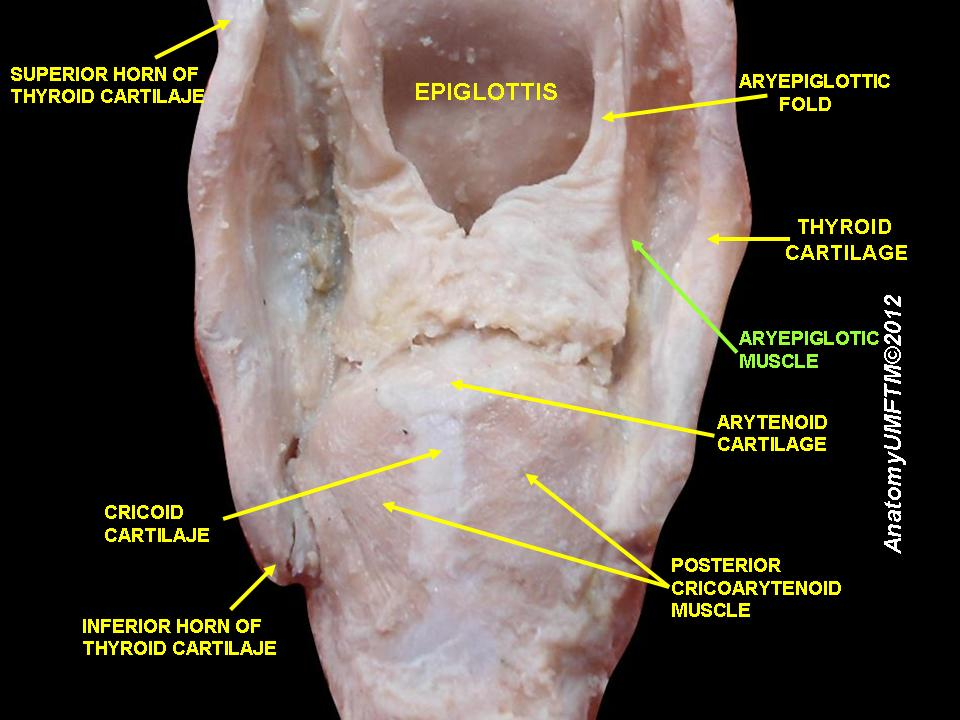
Aryepiglotic muscle

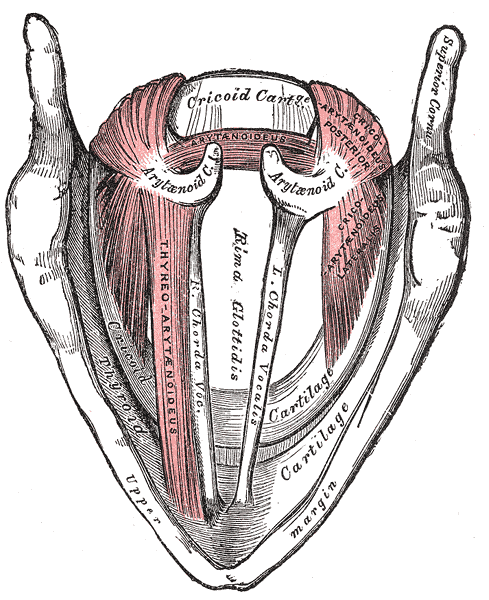
Muscles of the larynx, seen from above.

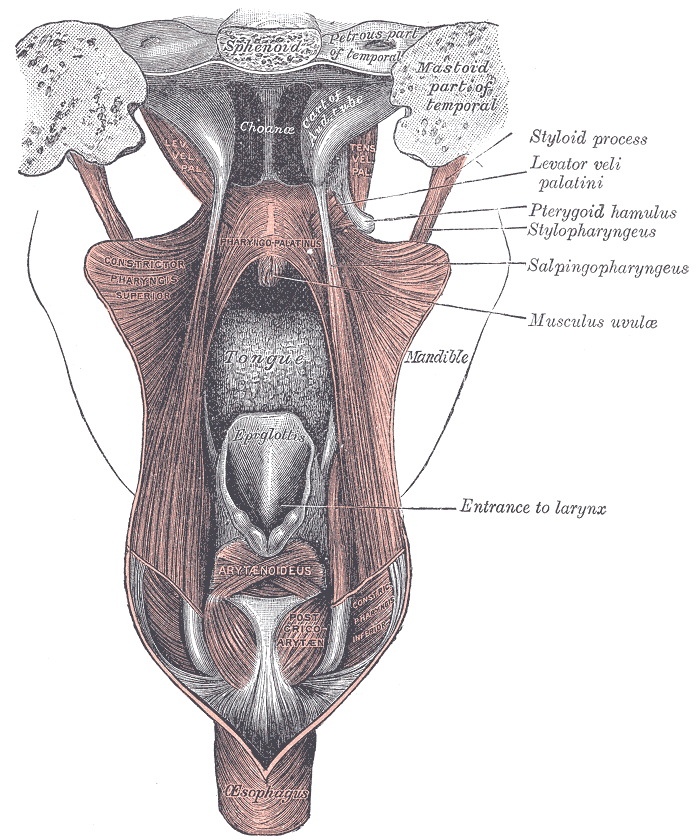
Dissection of the muscles of the palate from behind.
