= Laryngeal inlet =

Vocal structure

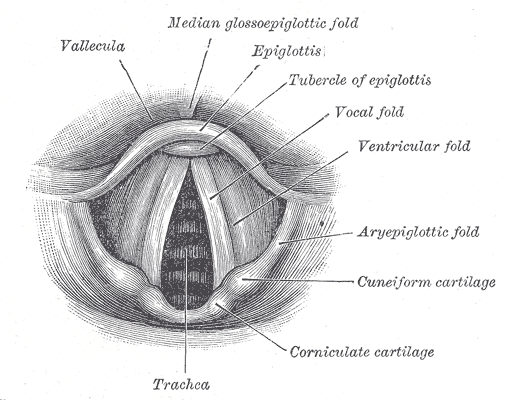
- The entrance to the larynx

Details

Identifiers
- Latin: aditus laryngis
- TA98: A06.2.09.002
- TA2: 3202
- FMA: 55405

The laryngeal inlet (laryngeal aditus, laryngeal aperture) is the opening that connects the pharynx and the larynx.

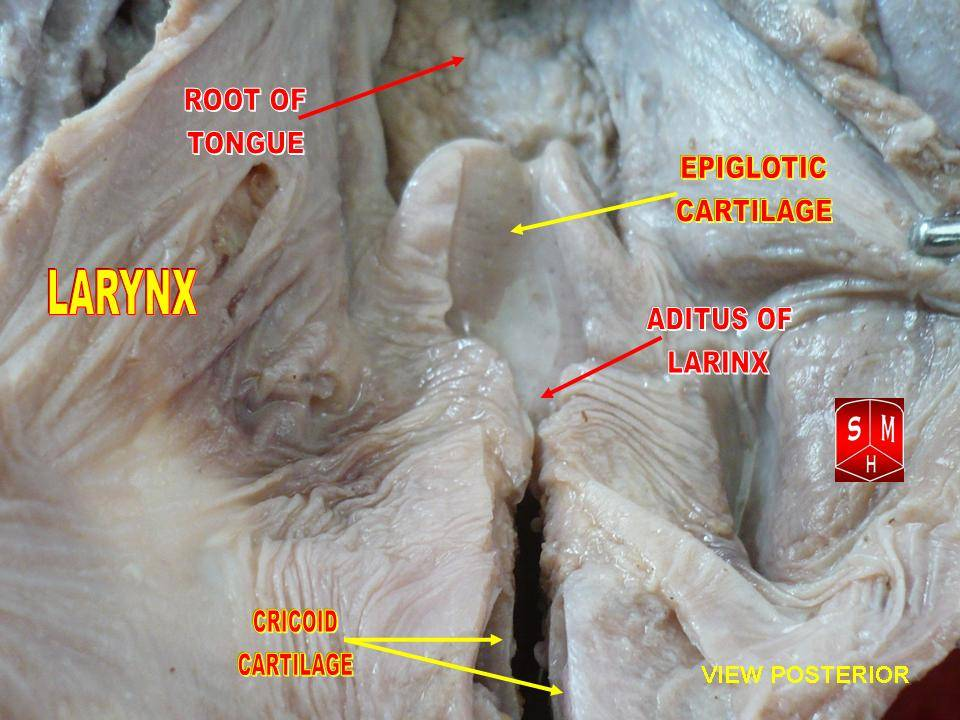
Aditus of larynx

== Borders ==
Its borders are formed by:

- the free curved edge of the epiglottis, anteriorly
- the arytenoid cartilages, the corniculate cartilages, and the interarytenoid fold, posteriorly
- the aryepiglottic fold, laterally

== Additional images ==
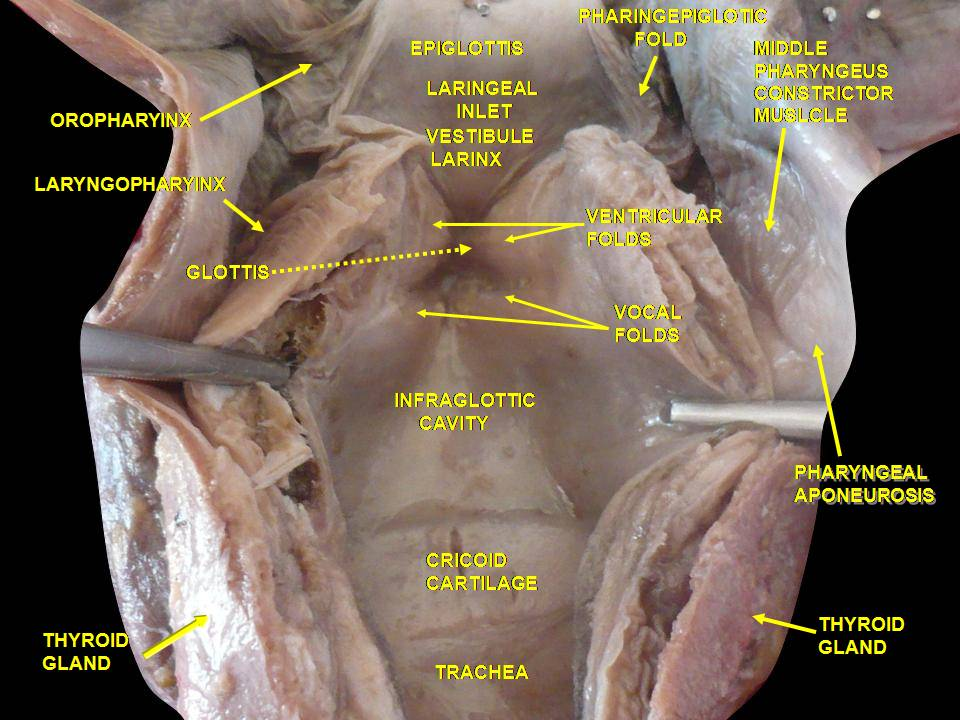
Deep dissection of larynx, pharynx and tongue seen from behind

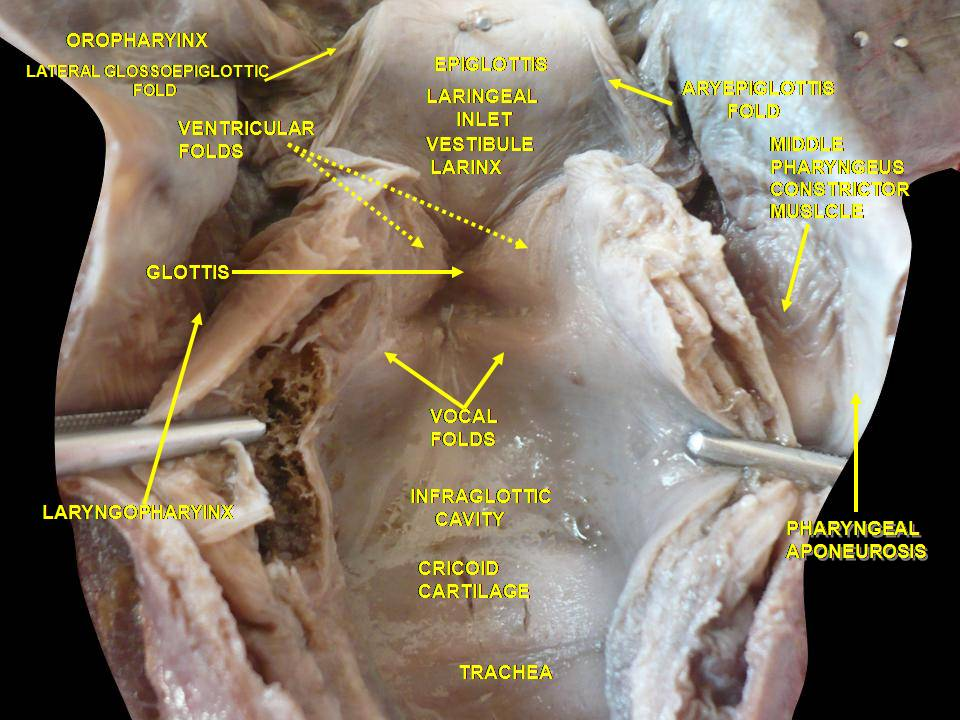
Deep dissection of larynx, pharynx and tongue seen from behind

== See also ==
- Aditus
