= Posterior cricoarytenoid muscle =

Muscle of the larynx

Posterior cricoarytenoid
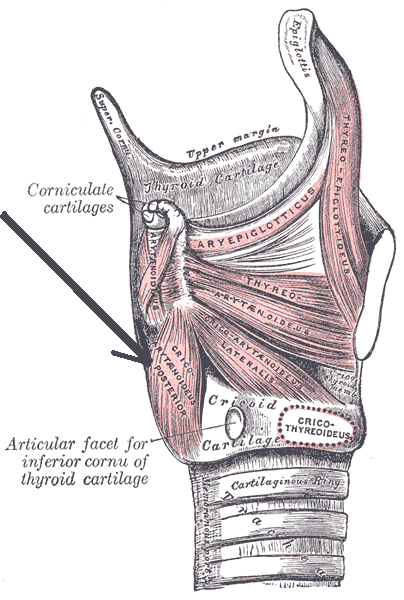
- Muscles of larynx. Side view. Right lamina of thyroid cartilage removed.

Details
- Origin: Posterior part of the cricoid
- Insertion: Posterior surface of muscular process of the arytenoid cartilage
- Nerve: Recurrent laryngeal nerve branch of the vagus nerve (CN X)
- Actions: Abducts and laterally rotates arytenoid cartilage, pulling vocal ligaments away from the midline and forward and so opening rima glottidis
- Antagonist: Lateral cricoarytenoid muscle

Identifiers
- Latin: musculus cricoarytaenoideus posterior
- TA98: A06.2.08.004
- TA2: 2196
- FMA: 46576

The posterior cricoarytenoid muscle is a (bilaterally paired) intrinsic muscle of the larynx. It arises from the cricoid cartilage; it inserts onto the arytenoid cartilage of the same side. It is innervated by the recurrent laryngeal nerve. Each acts to open the vocal folds by pulling the vocal fold of the same side laterally. It participates in the production of sounds.

== Structure ==
The muscle is directed superiorly and laterally from its origin to its insertion. The muscle's fibres vary in orientation superoinferiorly: the superior-most fibres are nearly horizontally oriented, the intermediate fibres are obliquely oriented, and the inferior-most fibres are nearly vertically oriented; the distinct orientations of muscle fibres may indicate that the muscle could produce different movements depending upon which portion of the muscle contracts.

According to a cadaveric study, the muscle exhibits two distinct bellies - a medial belly and a lateral belly - which differ in the orientation of their muscle fibres and the site of insertion at the muscular process.

=== Origin ===
The muscle originates from (the posterior aspect of) the lamina of cricoid cartilage.

=== Insertion ===
The muscle's fibres converge to insert onto (the superior, posterior and (minimally the) anterolateral aspects of) the muscular process of the ipsilateral arytenoid cartilage (its medial belly and lateral belly insert onto the muscular process medially and laterally, respectively).

=== Innervation ===
The posterior cricoarytenoid muscle receives motor innervation from (the anterior division of) the recurrent laryngeal nerve (itself a branch of the vagus nerve (CN X)).

Different parts of the muscle (such as the medial and lateral muscle bellies) are often innervated by separate branches. There may be 1-6 branches, but are usually 2-3. These may connect within the muscle. This innervation modality may indicate that the different parts of the muscle can be activated at different times so that it can produce different movements.

=== Vasculature ===
The muscle receives arterial supply from the laryngeal branches of the superior thyroid artery and inferior thyroid artery.

=== Actions/movements ===
The muscle rotates the arytenoid cartilages laterally, thereby abducting the vocal processes and the vocal folds that are attached to them. In this, the muscle is an antagonist of the lateral cricoarytenoid muscle.

The muscle additionally draws the arytenoid cartilages posterior-ward, thus (assisting in) lengthening the vocal cords (here acting as synergist of the cricothyroid muscle). The lateral-most portion of the muscle also draws the arytenoid cartilages lateral-ward, making the rima glottidis into a triangular shape.

== Function ==
The posterior cricoarytenoid muscles are the only muscles to open the vocal cords. By abducting the vocal folds, the muscle opens the rima glottidis. This is important in breathing and speech. The muscles participate in the production of unvoiced vocal sounds.

== Clinical significance ==
Paralysis of the posterior cricoarytenoid muscles may lead to asphyxia, as they are the only laryngeal muscles to open the vocal cords (allowing breathing). Denervation leads to a slow fibrosis that worsens over many months.

== Additional images ==
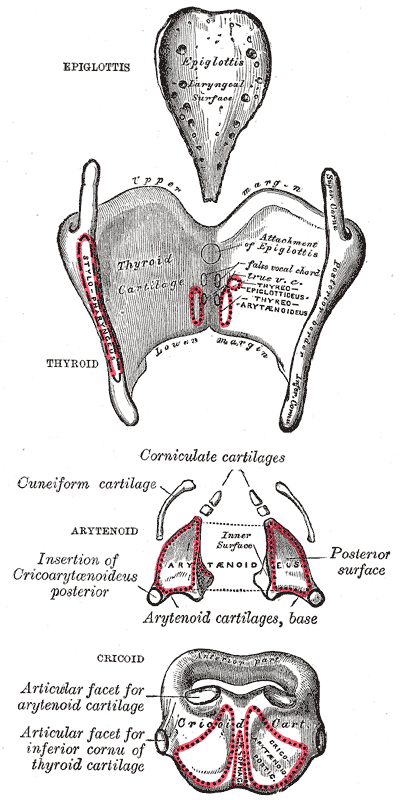
The cartilages of the larynx. Posterior view.

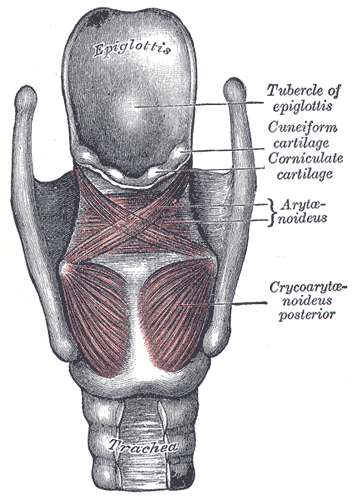
Muscles of larynx. Posterior view.

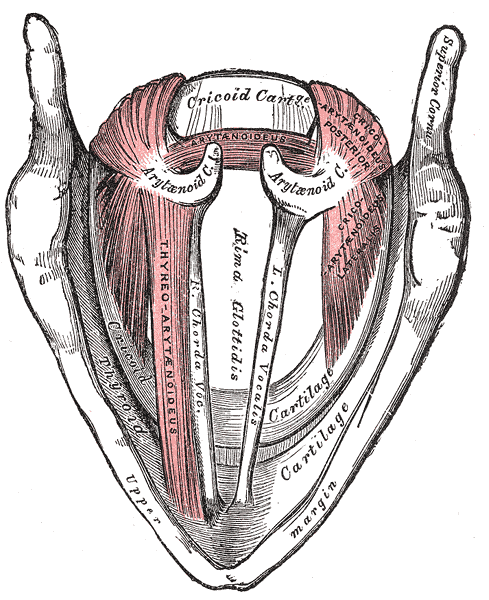
Muscles of the larynx, seen from above.

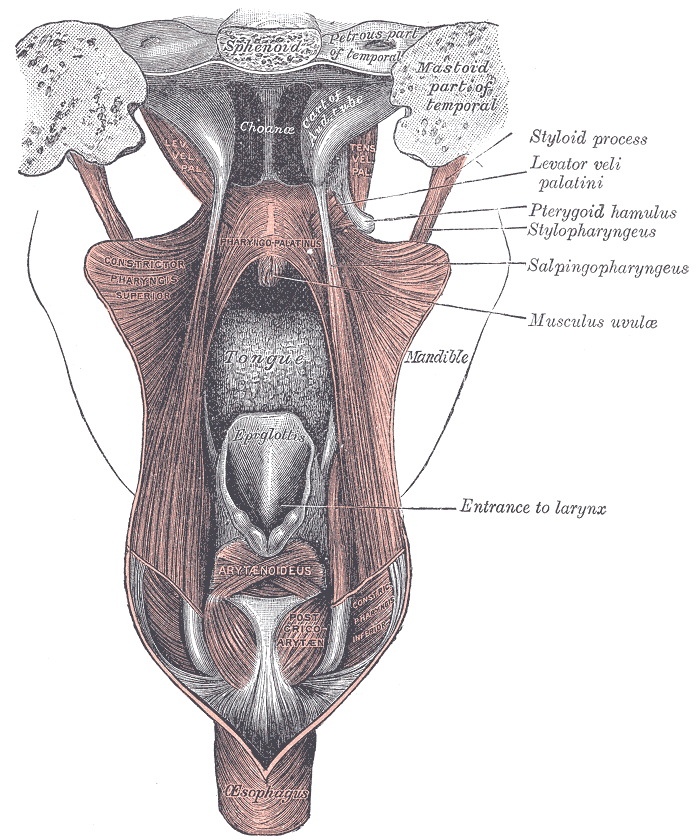
Dissection of the muscles of the palate from behind.

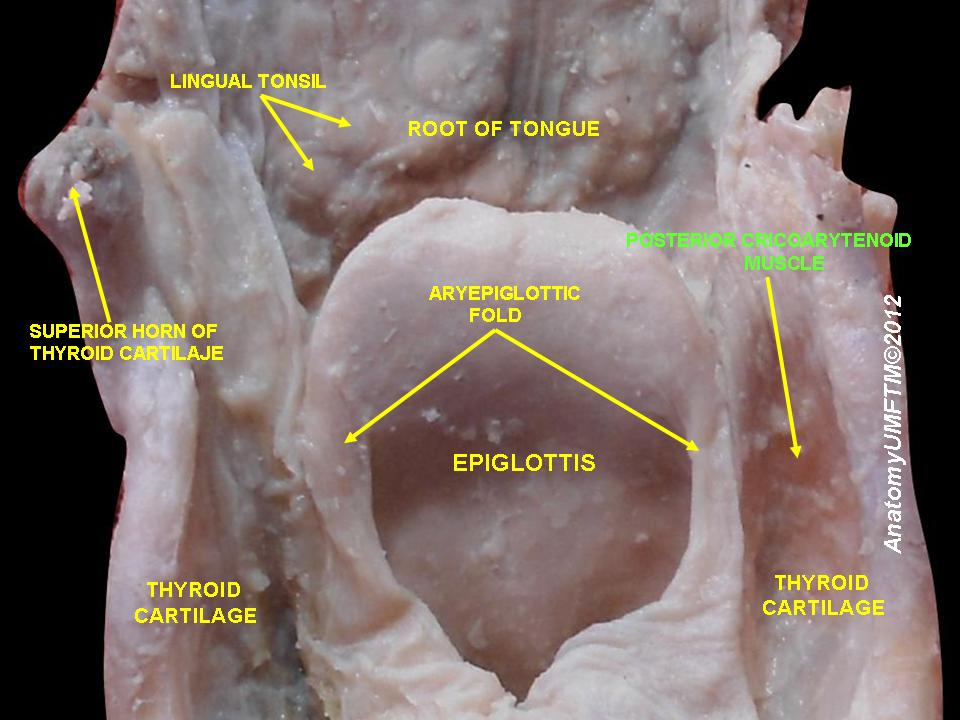
Posterior cricoarytenoid muscle

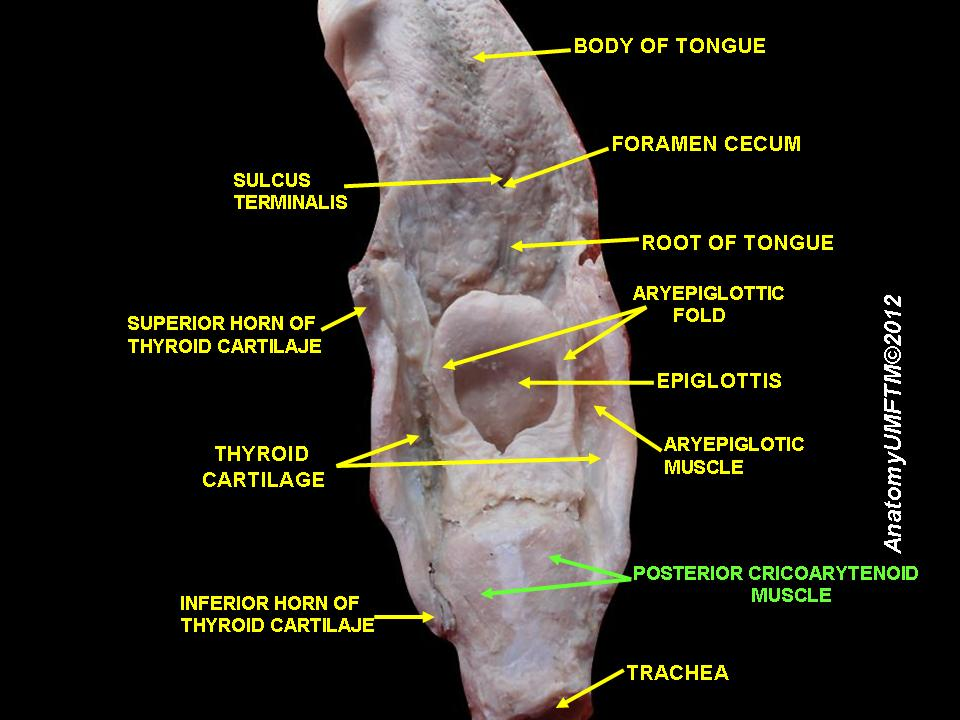
Posterior cricoarytenoid muscle

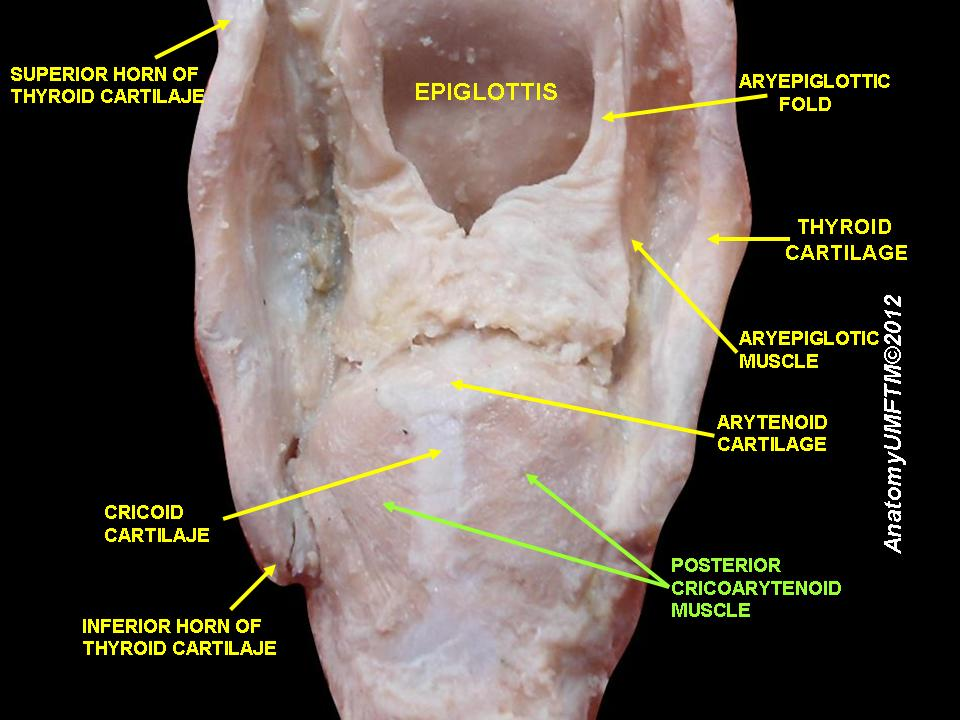
Posterior cricoarytenoid muscle

== See also ==
- Recurrent laryngeal nerve
