= Vocal process =

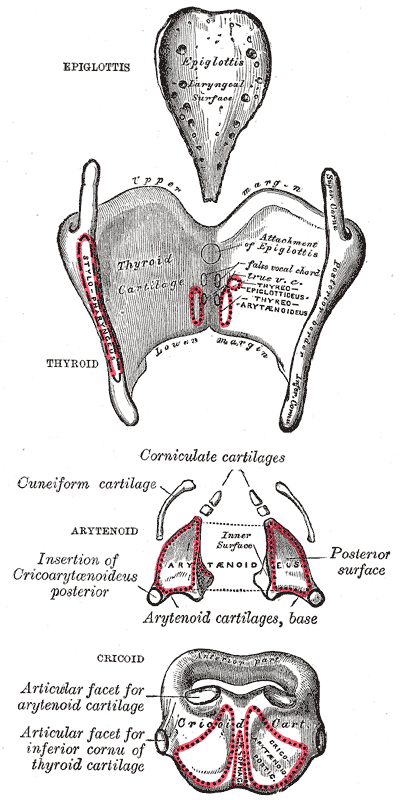
- Posterior view of the cartilages of the larynx

Details

Identifiers
- Latin: processus vocalis
- TA98: A06.2.04.005
- TA2: 986
- FMA: 55350

In the human larynx, the vocal process is the anterior angle of the base of the arytenoid cartilage, as it projects horizontally forward and gives attachment to the vocal ligament.

The arytenoids are paired cartilages with a medial and a lateral process each. The medial process is called the vocal process because it is the attachment for the vocal ligament. The lateral process is the attachment of one of the major intrinsic muscles of the vocal folds and consequently named the muscular process.

As the concave bases of the arytenoid cartilages move on the two convex articular surfaces on the cricoid cartilage (at the cricoarytenoid articulations), the vocal processes are brought closer to each other, which permits the vocal folds to make contact (adduct) and abduct.

Just above the vocal process is a shallow depression, the oblong fovea of the arytenoid cartilage. Together they constitute the insertion for the vocalis muscle.

Vocal process granulomas are rare and benign lesions that occur in 0.9–2.7% of adults with a voice disorder. Most occurrences and forms of vocal process granulomas regress spontaneously without any specific treatment, even large ones.
