= Corniculate cartilages =

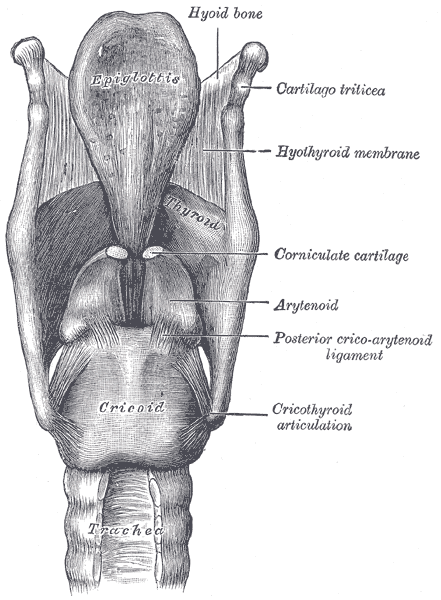
- Ligaments of the larynx. Posterior view. (Corniculate cartilage labeled at center right.)

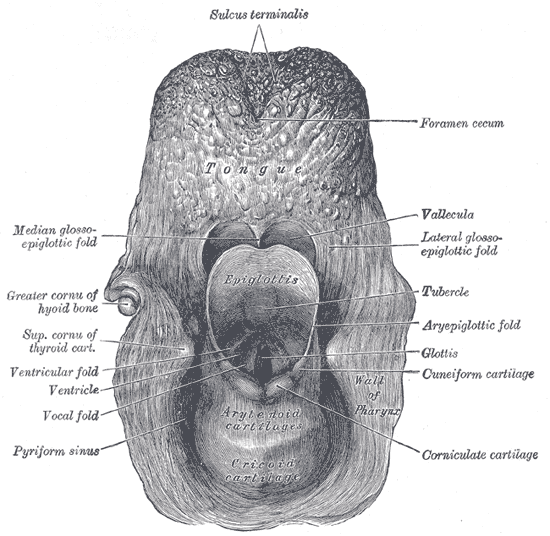
- The entrance to the larynx, viewed from behind. (Corniculate cartilage labeled at bottom right.)

Details

Identifiers
- Latin: cartilagines corniculata
- TA98: A06.2.05.001
- TA2: 997
- FMA: 55110

The corniculate cartilages (cartilages of Santorini) are two small conical nodules in the larynx, consisting of elastic cartilage, which articulate with the summits of the arytenoid cartilages and serve to prolong them posteriorly and medially.

They are situated in the posterior parts of the aryepiglottic folds of mucous membrane, and are sometimes fused with the arytenoid cartilages.

== Eponym ==
It is named by Giovanni Domenico Santorini. The word "corniculate" has the Latin root "cornu", meaning "horn". This refers to the appearance of the corniculate cartilages as horn-like projections.

== Additional images ==
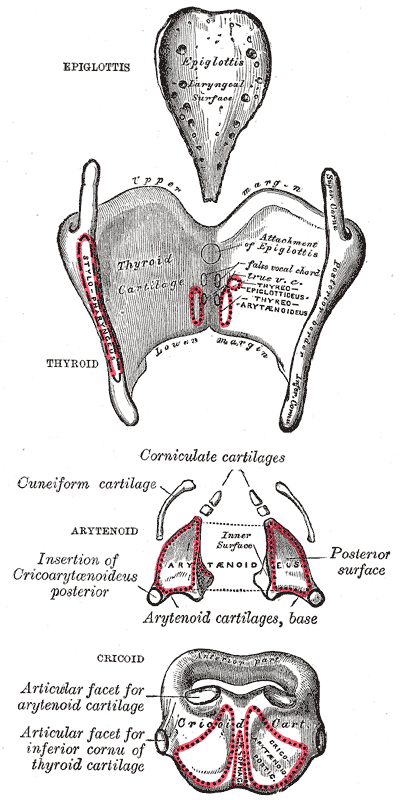
The cartilages of the larynx. Posterior view.

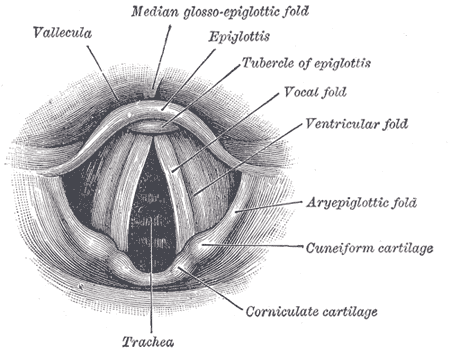
Laryngoscopic view of interior of larynx.

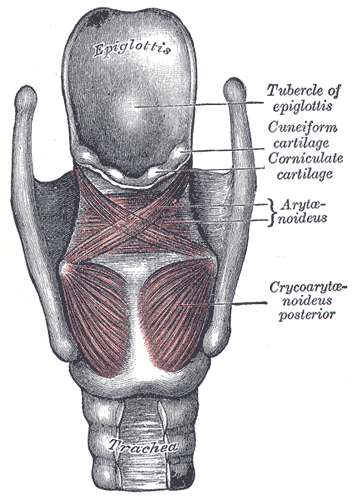
Muscles of larynx. Posterior view.

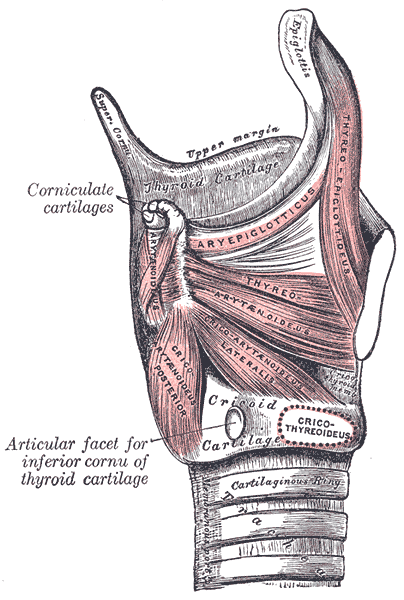
Muscles of larynx. Side view. Right lamina of thyroid cartilage removed.

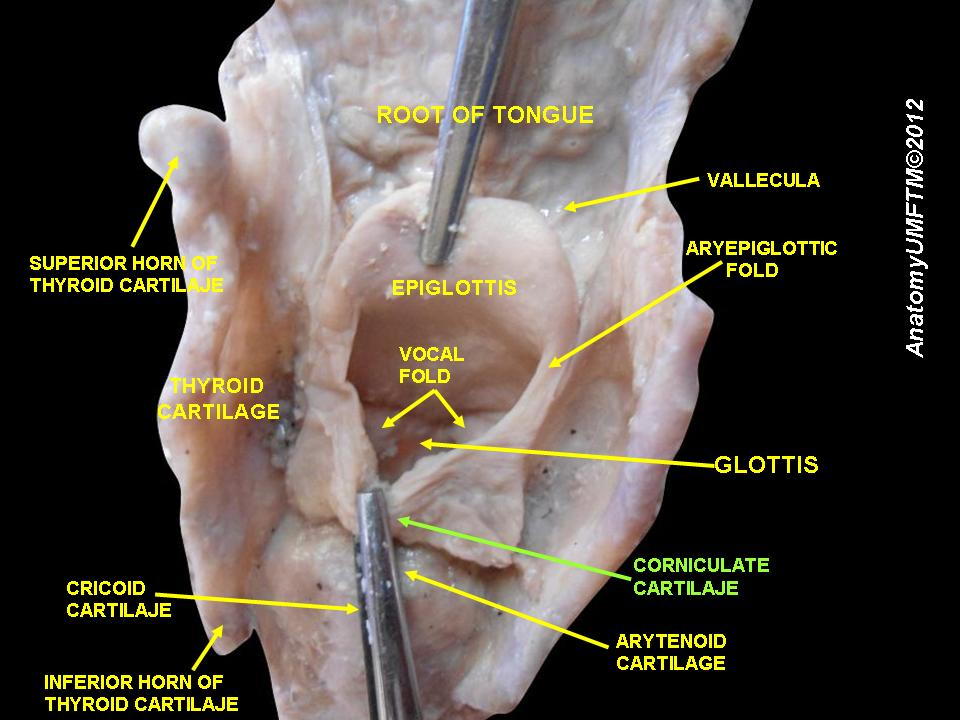
Corniculate cartilages
