= Muscular process of arytenoid cartilage =

Human anatomical structure

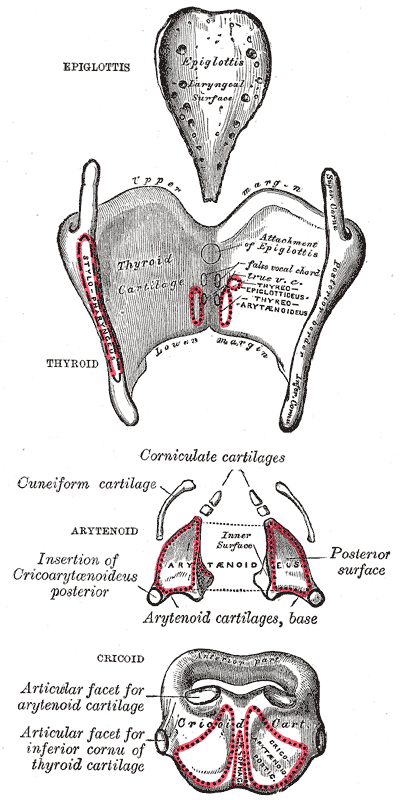
- The cartilages of the larynx. Posterior view.

Details

Identifiers
- Latin: processus muscularis cartilaginis arytenoideae
- TA98: A06.2.04.013
- TA2: 987
- FMA: 55351

The muscular process of arytenoid cartilage is the posterolateral projection of the (short, rounded, and prominent) lateral angle of the base of the arytenoid cartilage. The muscular process gives insertion to the posterior cricoarytenoid muscles behind, and to the lateral cricoarytenoid muscles in front.
