= Larynx =

Voice box, an organ in the neck of amphibians, reptiles, and mammals

- Anatomy of the human larynx, anterolateral view

Details
- Pronunciation: /ˈlærɪŋks/ LARR-inks

Identifiers
- Latin: larynx
- Greek: λάρυγξ
- MeSH: D007830
- TA98: A06.2.01.001
- TA2: 3184
- FMA: 55097

The larynx (pl.: larynges or larynxes), commonly called the voice box, is an organ in the top of the neck involved in respiration, producing sound and protecting the trachea against food aspiration. The opening of the larynx into the pharynx, known as the laryngeal inlet, is about 4–5 centimeters in diameter. The larynx houses the vocal cords, and manipulates pitch and volume, which is essential for phonation. It is situated just below where the tract of the pharynx splits into the trachea and the esophagus.

== Structure ==
The basic parts of the human larynx.

The triangle-shaped larynx consists largely of cartilages that are attached to surrounding structures by muscles or by fibrous and elastic tissue components. The larynx is lined by a ciliated columnar epithelium except for the vocal folds. The cavity of the larynx extends from its triangle-shaped inlet to the epiglottis, and to the circular outlet at the lower border of the cricoid cartilage, where it is continuous with the lumen of the trachea. The mucous membrane lining the larynx forms two pairs of lateral folds that project inward into its cavity. The upper folds are called the vestibular folds. They are also sometimes called the false vocal cords because they are not involved in vocalization. The Kargyraa style of Tuvan throat singing makes use of these folds to sing an octave lower, and they are used in Umngqokolo, a type of Xhosa throat singing. The lower pair of folds is known as the vocal cords, which produce sounds needed for speech and other vocalizations. The slit-like space between the left and right vocal cords, called the rima glottidis, is the narrowest part of the larynx. The vocal cords and the rima glottidis are collectively referred to as the glottis. The laryngeal cavity above the vestibular folds is called the vestibule. The very middle portion of the cavity between the vestibular folds and the vocal cords is the ventricle of the larynx, or laryngeal ventricle. The infraglottic cavity is the open space below the glottis.

=== Location ===
In adult humans, the larynx is found in the anterior neck at the level of the cervical vertebrae C3–C6. It connects the inferior part of the pharynx (hypopharynx) with the trachea. The laryngeal skeleton consists of nine cartilages: three single (epiglottic, thyroid and cricoid) and three paired (arytenoid, corniculate, and cuneiform). The hyoid bone is not part of the larynx, though the larynx is suspended from the hyoid. The larynx extends vertically from the tip of the epiglottis to the inferior border of the cricoid cartilage. Its interior can be divided into supraglottis, glottis, and subglottis.

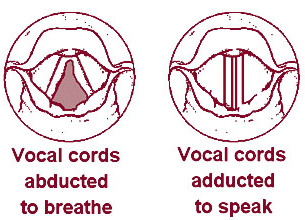
Vocal cords abducted and adducted

=== Cartilages ===
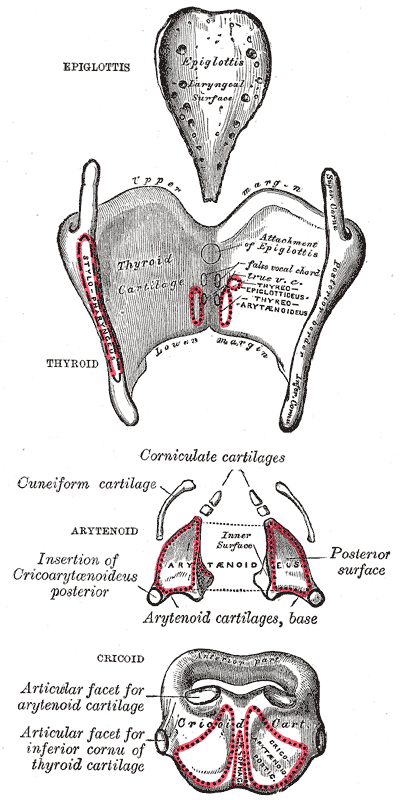
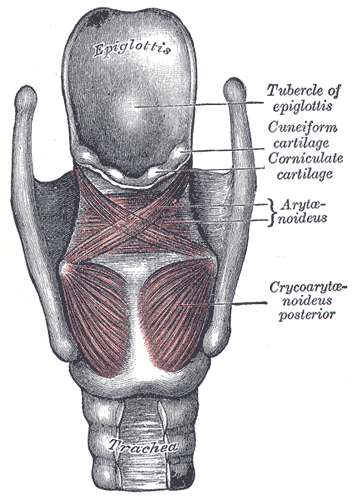
Posterior view of the larynx; disarticulated cartilages (left) and intrinsic muscles (right)

There are nine cartilages, three unpaired and three paired (3 pairs), that support the mammalian larynx and form its skeleton.

Unpaired cartilages:

- Thyroid cartilage: This forms the Adam's apple (also called the laryngeal prominence). It is usually larger in males than in females. The thyrohyoid membrane is a ligament associated with the thyroid cartilage that connects it with the hyoid bone. It supports the front portion of the larynx.
- Cricoid cartilage: A ring of hyaline cartilage that forms the inferior wall of the larynx. It is attached to the top of the trachea. The median cricothyroid ligament connects the cricoid cartilage to the thyroid cartilage.
- Epiglottis: A large, spoon-shaped piece of elastic cartilage. During swallowing, the pharynx and larynx rise. Elevation of the pharynx widens it to receive food and drink; elevation of the larynx causes the epiglottis to move down and form a lid over the glottis, closing it off.

Paired cartilages:

- Arytenoid cartilages: Of the paired cartilages, the arytenoid cartilages are the most important because they influence the position and tension of the vocal cords. These are triangular pieces of mostly hyaline cartilage located at the posterosuperior border of the cricoid cartilage.
- Corniculate cartilages: Horn-shaped pieces of elastic cartilage located at the apex of each arytenoid cartilage.
- Cuneiform cartilages: Club-shaped pieces of elastic cartilage located anterior to the corniculate cartilages.

=== Muscles ===
The muscles of the larynx are divided into intrinsic and extrinsic muscles. The extrinsic muscles act on the region and pass between the larynx and parts around it, and so have their origin elsewhere; the intrinsic muscles are confined entirely within the larynx and have their origin and insertion there.

The intrinsic muscles are divided into respiratory and the phonatory muscles (the muscles of phonation). The respiratory muscles move the vocal cords apart and serve breathing. The phonatory muscles move the vocal cords together and serve the production of voice. The main respiratory muscles are the posterior cricoarytenoid muscles. The phonatory muscles are divided into adductors (lateral cricoarytenoid muscles, arytenoid muscles) and tensors (cricothyroid muscles, thyroarytenoid muscles).

==== Intrinsic ====
The intrinsic laryngeal muscles are responsible for controlling sound production.

- Cricothyroid muscle lengthens and tenses the vocal cords.
- Posterior cricoarytenoid muscles abduct and externally rotate the arytenoid cartilages, resulting in abducted vocal cords.
- Lateral cricoarytenoid muscles adduct and internally rotate the arytenoid cartilages, increasing medial compression.
- Transverse arytenoid muscle adducts the arytenoid cartilages, resulting in adducted vocal cords.
- Oblique arytenoid muscles narrow the laryngeal inlet by constricting the distance between the arytenoid cartilages.
- Thyroarytenoid muscles narrow the laryngeal inlet, shortening the vocal cords, and lowering voice pitch. The internal thyroarytenoid is the portion of the thyroarytenoid that vibrates to produce sound.

Notably, the only muscle capable of separating the vocal cords for normal breathing is the posterior cricoarytenoid. If this muscle is incapacitated on both sides, the inability to pull the vocal cords apart (abduct) will cause difficulty breathing. Bilateral injury to the recurrent laryngeal nerve would cause this condition. It is also worth noting that all muscles are innervated by the recurrent laryngeal branch of the vagus except the cricothyroid muscle, which is innervated by the external laryngeal branch of the superior laryngeal nerve (a branch of the vagus).

Additionally, intrinsic laryngeal muscles present a constitutive Ca^{2+}-buffering profile that predicts their better ability to handle calcium changes in comparison to other muscles. This profile is in agreement with their function as very fast muscles with a well-developed capacity for prolonged work. Studies suggests that mechanisms involved in the prompt sequestering of Ca^{2+} (sarcoplasmic reticulum Ca^{2+}-reuptake proteins, plasma membrane pumps, and cytosolic Ca^{2+}-buffering proteins) are particularly elevated in laryngeal muscles, indicating their importance for the myofiber function and protection against disease, such as Duchenne muscular dystrophy. Furthermore, different levels of Orai1 in rat intrinsic laryngeal muscles and extraocular muscles over the limb muscle suggest a role for store-operated calcium entry channels in those muscles' functional properties and signaling mechanisms.

==== Extrinsic ====
The extrinsic laryngeal muscles support and position the larynx within the mid-cervical cereal region.

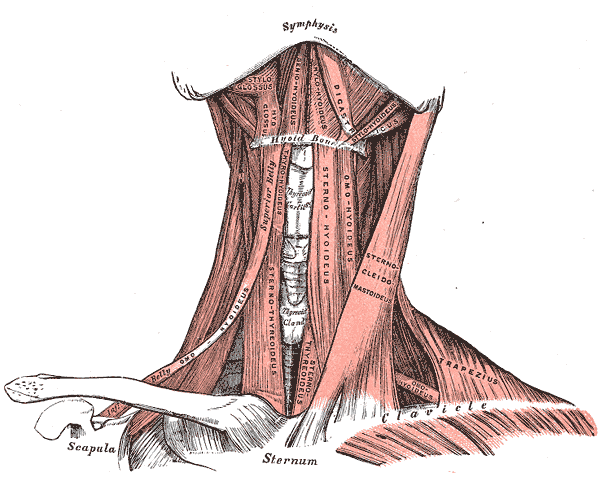
Extrinsic laryngeal muscles

- Sternothyroid muscle depresses the larynx. (Innervated by ansa cervicalis)
- Omohyoid muscle depresses the larynx. (Ansa cervicalis)
- Sternohyoid muscle depresses the larynx. (Ansa cervicalis)
- Inferior constrictor muscles. (CN X)
- Thyrohyoid muscle elevates the larynx. (C1)
- Digastric elevates the larynx. (CN V_{3}, CN VII)
- Stylohyoid elevates the larynx. (CN VII)
- Mylohyoid elevates the larynx. (CN V_{3})
- Geniohyoid elevates the larynx. (C1)
- Hyoglossus elevates the larynx. (CN XII)
- Genioglossus elevates the larynx. (CN XII)

=== Nerve supply ===
The larynx is innervated by branches of the vagus nerve on each side. Sensory innervation to the glottis and laryngeal vestibule is by the internal branch of the superior laryngeal nerve. The external branch of the superior laryngeal nerve innervates the cricothyroid muscle. Motor innervation to all other muscles of the larynx and sensory innervation to the subglottis are by the recurrent laryngeal nerve. While the sensory input described above is (general) visceral sensation (diffuse, poorly localized), the vocal cords also receive general somatic sensory innervation (proprioceptive and touch) by the superior laryngeal nerve.

Injury to the external branch of the superior laryngeal nerve causes weakened phonation because the vocal cords cannot be tightened. Injury to one of the recurrent laryngeal nerves produces hoarseness; if both are damaged, the voice may or may not be preserved, but breathing becomes difficult.

=== Development ===
The larynx is derived from the mesoderm of the fourth and sixth pharyngeal arches. In newborn infants, the larynx is initially at the level of the C2–C3 vertebrae, and is further forward and higher relative to its position in the adult body. The larynx descends as the child grows.

== Laryngeal cavity ==
Laryngeal cavity
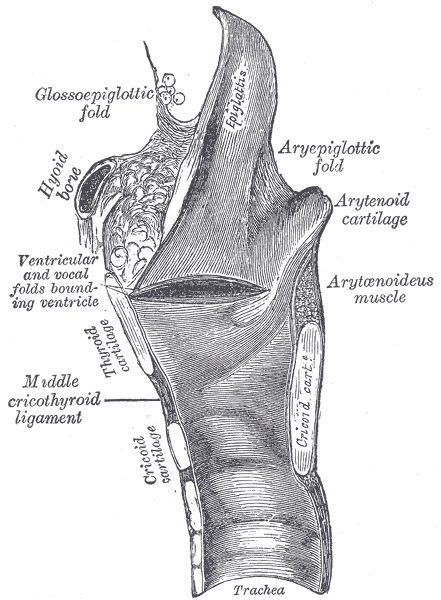
- Sagittal section of the larynx and upper part of the trachea.

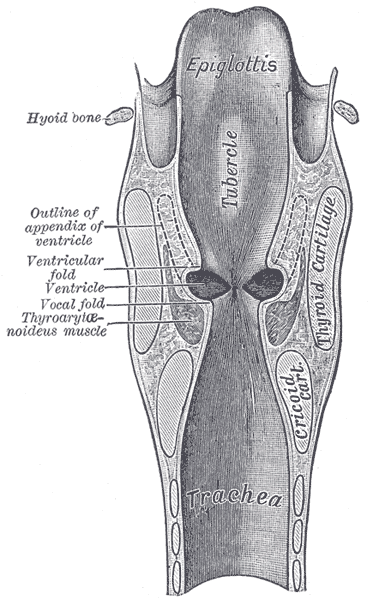
- Coronal section of larynx and upper part of trachea.

Details

Identifiers
- Latin: cavitas laryngis
- MeSH: D007830
- TA98: A06.2.01.001
- TA2: 3184
- FMA: 55097

The laryngeal cavity (cavity of the larynx) extends from the laryngeal inlet downwards to the lower border of the cricoid cartilage, where it is continuous with that of the trachea.

It is divided into two parts by the projection of the vocal folds, between which is a narrow triangular opening, the rima glottidis.

The portion of the cavity of the larynx above the vestibular folds is called the laryngeal vestibule; it is wide and triangular in shape, its base or anterior wall presenting, however, about its center, the backward projection of the tubercle of the epiglottis.

It contains the vestibular folds, and between these and the vocal folds are the laryngeal ventricles.

The portion below the vocal folds is called the infraglottic cavity. It is at first of an elliptical form, but lower down it widens out, assumes a circular form, and is continuous with the tube of the trachea.

== Function ==
=== Sound generation ===
Sound is generated in the larynx, and that is where pitch and volume are manipulated. The strength of expiration from the lungs also contributes to loudness.

Manipulation of the larynx is used to generate a source sound with a particular fundamental frequency, or pitch. This source sound is altered as it travels through the vocal tract, configured differently based on the position of the tongue, lips, mouth, and pharynx. The process of altering a source sound as it passes through the filter of the vocal tract creates the many different vowel and consonant sounds of the world's languages, as well as tone, certain realizations of stress, and other types of linguistic prosody. The larynx also has a similar function to the lungs in creating pressure differences required for sound production; a constricted larynx can be raised or lowered, affecting the volume of the oral cavity as necessary in glottalic consonants.

The vocal cords can be held close together (by adducting the arytenoid cartilages) so that they vibrate (see phonation). The muscles attached to the arytenoid cartilages control the degree of opening. Vocal cord length and tension can be controlled by rocking the thyroid cartilage forward and backward on the cricoid cartilage (either directly by contracting the cricothyroids or indirectly by changing the vertical position of the larynx), by manipulating the tension of the muscles within the vocal cords, and by moving the arytenoids forward or backward. This causes the pitch produced during phonation to rise or fall. In most males, the vocal cords are longer and have a greater mass than most females vocal cords, producing a lower pitch.

The vocal apparatus consists of two pairs of folds, the vestibular folds (false vocal cords) and the true vocal cords. The vestibular folds are covered by respiratory epithelium, while the vocal cords are covered by stratified squamous epithelium. The vestibular folds are not responsible for sound production, but rather for resonance. The exceptions to this are found in Tibetan chanting and Kargyraa, a style of Tuvan throat singing. Both make use of the vestibular folds to create an undertone. These false vocal cords do not contain muscle, while the true vocal cords do have skeletal muscle.

=== Other ===
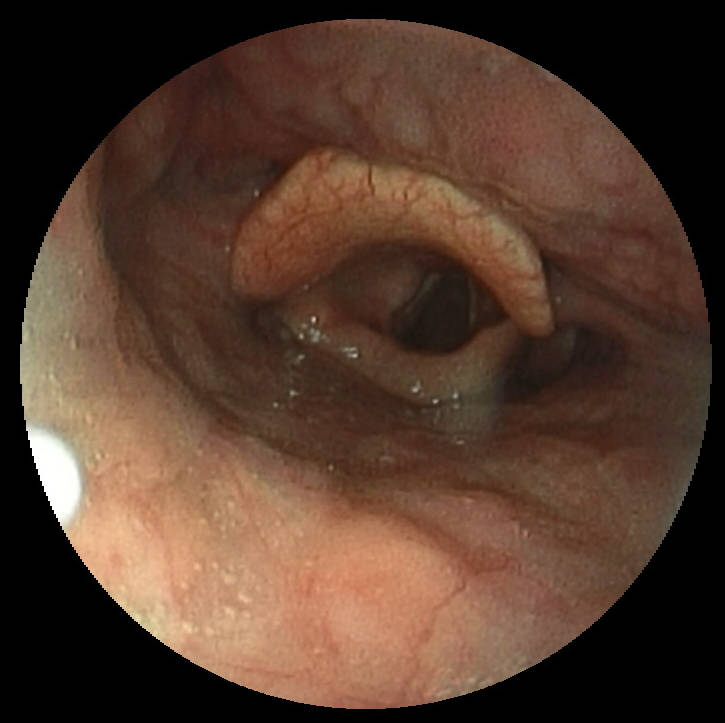
Image of endoscopy

The most important role of the larynx is its protective function, the prevention of foreign objects from entering the lungs by coughing and other reflexive actions. A cough is initiated by a deep inhalation through the vocal cords, followed by the elevation of the larynx and the tight adduction (closing) of the vocal cords. The forced expiration that follows, assisted by tissue recoil and the muscles of expiration, blows the vocal cords apart, and the high pressure expels the irritating object out of the throat. Throat clearing is less violent than coughing, but is a similar increased respiratory effort countered by the tightening of the laryngeal musculature. Both coughing and throat clearing are predictable and necessary actions because they clear the respiratory passageway, but both place the vocal cords under significant strain.

Another important role of the larynx is abdominal fixation, a kind of Valsalva maneuver in which the lungs are filled with air in order to stiffen the thorax so that forces applied for lifting can be translated down to the legs. This is achieved by a deep inhalation followed by the adduction of the vocal cords. Grunting while lifting heavy objects is the result of some air escaping through the adducted vocal cords, ready for phonation.

Abduction of the vocal cords is important during physical exertion. The vocal cords are separated by about 8 mm (0.31 in) during normal respiration, but this width is doubled during forced respiration.

During swallowing, elevation of the posterior portion of the tongue levers (inverts) the epiglottis over the glottis' opening to prevent swallowed material from entering the larynx which leads to the lungs, and provides a path for a food or liquid bolus to "slide" into the esophagus; the hyo-laryngeal complex is also pulled upwards to assist this process. Stimulation of the larynx by aspirated food or liquid produces a strong cough reflex to protect the lungs.

In addition, intrinsic laryngeal muscles are spared from some muscle wasting disorders, such as Duchenne muscular dystrophy, which may facilitate the development of novel strategies for the prevention and treatment of muscle wasting in a variety of clinical scenarios. ILM has a calcium regulation system profile suggestive of a better ability to handle calcium changes in comparison to other muscles, and this may provide a mechanistic insight for their unique pathophysiological properties

== Clinical significance ==
=== Disorders ===
There are several things that can cause a larynx to not function properly. Some symptoms are hoarseness, loss of voice, pain in the throat or ears, and breathing difficulties.

- Acute laryngitis is the sudden inflammation and swelling of the larynx. It is caused by the common cold or by excessive shouting. It is not serious.
- Chronic laryngitis is caused by smoking, dust, frequent yelling, or prolonged exposure to polluted air. It is much more serious than acute laryngitis.
- Presbylarynx is a condition in which age-related atrophy of the soft tissues of the larynx results in a weak voice and restricted vocal range, and reduced stamina. Bowing of the anterior portion of the vocal cords is found on laryngoscopy.
- Ulcers may be caused by the prolonged presence of an endotracheal tube.
- Polyps and vocal cord nodules are small bumps caused by prolonged exposure to tobacco smoke and vocal misuse, respectively.
- Two related types of cancer of the larynx, namely squamous cell carcinoma and verrucous carcinoma, are strongly associated with repeated exposure to cigarette smoke and alcohol.
- Vocal cord paresis is a weakness of one or both vocal cords that can greatly impact daily life.
- Idiopathic laryngeal spasm.
- Laryngopharyngeal reflux is a condition in which acid from the stomach irritates and burns the larynx. Similar damage can occur with gastroesophageal reflux disease (GERD).
- Laryngomalacia is a very common condition of infancy, in which the soft, immature cartilage of the upper larynx collapses inward during inhalation, causing airway obstruction.
- Laryngeal perichondritis, the inflammation of the perichondrium of laryngeal cartilages, causing airway obstruction.
- Laryngeal paralysis is a condition seen in some mammals (including dogs) in which the larynx no longer opens as wide as required for the passage of air, and impedes respiration. In mild cases, it can lead to exaggerated or "raspy" breathing or panting, and in serious cases can pose a considerable need for treatment.
- Duchenne muscular dystrophy, intrinsic laryngeal muscles (ILM) are spared from the lack of dystrophin and may serve as a useful model to study the mechanisms of muscle sparing in neuromuscular diseases. Dystrophic ILM presented a significant increase in the expression of calcium-binding proteins. The increase of calcium-binding proteins in dystrophic ILM may permit better maintenance of calcium homeostasis, with the consequent absence of myonecrosis. The results further support the concept that abnormal calcium buffering is involved in these neuromuscular diseases.

== Treatments ==
In some regions patients who have lost the use of their larynx are typically prescribed the use of an electrolarynx device. In other regions a voice prosthesis, called a Tracheo-esophageal puncture (TEP) is the more common type of communication device to replace the larynx.

Larynx transplants are a rare procedure. The world's first successful operation took place in 1998 at the Cleveland Clinic in Cleveland, Ohio, USA, and the second took place in October 2010 at the University of California Davis Medical Center in Sacramento, California, USA.

== Other animals ==
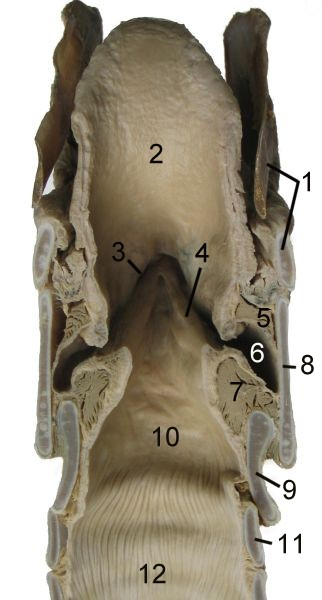
Cut through the larynx of a horse (frontal section, posterior view) 1 hyoid bone; 2 epiglottis; 3 vestibular fold; 4 vocal fold; 5 ventricularis muscle; 6 ventricle of larynx; 7 vocalis muscle; 8 thyroid cartilage; 9 cricoid cartilage; 10 infraglottic cavity; 11 first tracheal cartilage; 12 trachea

Pioneering work on the structure and evolution of the larynx was carried out in the 1920s by the British comparative anatomist Victor Negus, culminating in his monumental work The Mechanism of the Larynx (1929). Negus, however, pointed out that the descent of the larynx reflected the reshaping and descent of the human tongue into the pharynx. This process is not complete until the age of six to eight years. Some researchers, such as Philip Lieberman, Dennis Klatt, Bart de Boer and Kenneth Stevens using computer-modeling techniques have suggested that the species-specific human tongue allows the vocal tract (the airway above the larynx) to assume the shapes necessary to produce speech sounds that enhance the robustness of human speech. Sounds such as the vowels of the words ⟨see⟩ and ⟨do⟩, [i] and [u] (in phonetic notation), have been shown to be less subject to confusion in classic studies such as the 1950 Peterson and Barney investigation of the possibilities for computerized speech recognition.

In contrast, though other species have low larynges, their tongues remain anchored in their mouths, and their vocal tracts cannot produce the range of speech sounds of humans. The ability to lower the larynx transiently in some species extends the length of their vocal tract, which, as Fitch showed, creates the acoustic illusion that they are larger. Research at Haskins Laboratories in the 1960s showed that speech allows humans to achieve a vocal communication rate that exceeds the fusion frequency of the auditory system by fusing sounds together into syllables and words. The additional speech sounds that the human tongue enables us to produce, particularly [i], allow humans to unconsciously infer the length of the vocal tract of the person who is talking, a critical element in recovering the phonemes that make up a word.

=== Non-mammals ===
Most tetrapod species possess a larynx, but its structure is typically simpler than that found in mammals. The cartilages surrounding the larynx are apparently a remnant of the original gill arches in fish, and are a common feature, but not all are always present. For example, the thyroid cartilage is found only in mammals. Similarly, only mammals possess a true epiglottis, although a flap of non-cartilagenous mucosa is found in a similar position in many other groups. In modern amphibians, the laryngeal skeleton is considerably reduced; frogs have only the cricoid and arytenoid cartilages, while salamanders possess only the arytenoids.

An example of a frog that possesses a larynx is the túngara frog. While the larynx is the main sound-producing organ in túngara frogs, it serves a higher significance due to its contribution to the mating call, which consists of two components: 'whine' and 'chuck'. While 'whine' induces female phonotaxis and allows species recognition, 'chuck' increases mating attractiveness. In particular, the túngara frog produces 'chuck' by vibrating the fibrous mass attached to the larynx.

Vocal folds are found only in mammals, and a few lizards. As a result, many reptiles and amphibians are essentially voiceless; frogs use ridges in the trachea to modulate sound, while birds have a separate sound-producing organ, the syrinx.

== History and etymology ==
The ancient Greek physician Galen first described the larynx, describing it as the "first and supremely most important instrument of the voice".

The word larynx is borrowed from the Ancient Greek λάρυγξ (lárunx, lit. ''larynx, gullet, throat'').

== Additional images ==
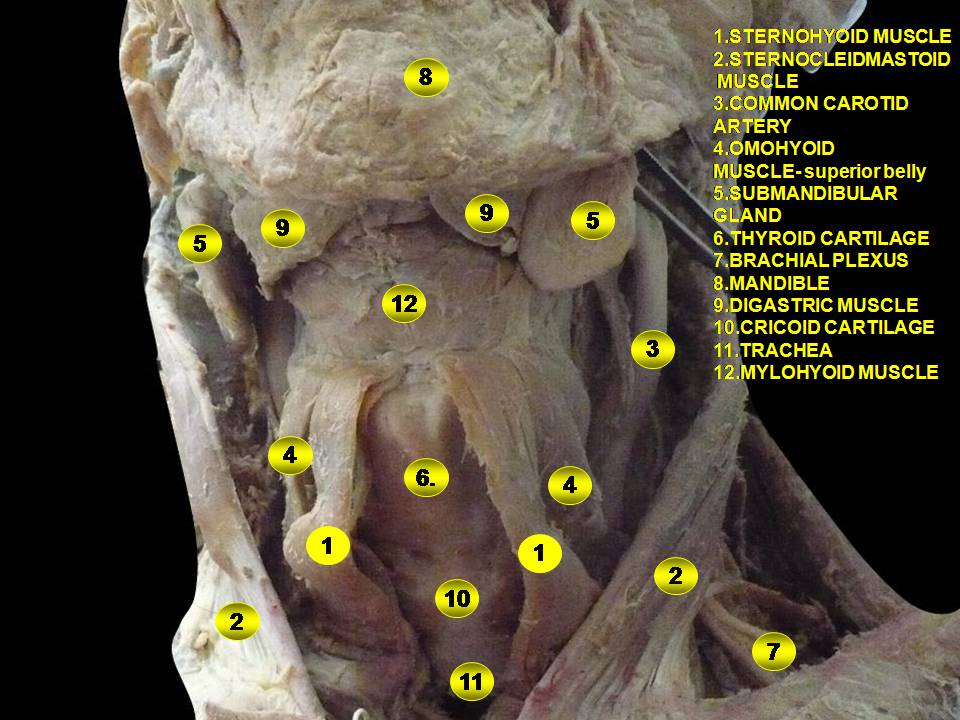
Larynx. Deep dissection. Anterior view.

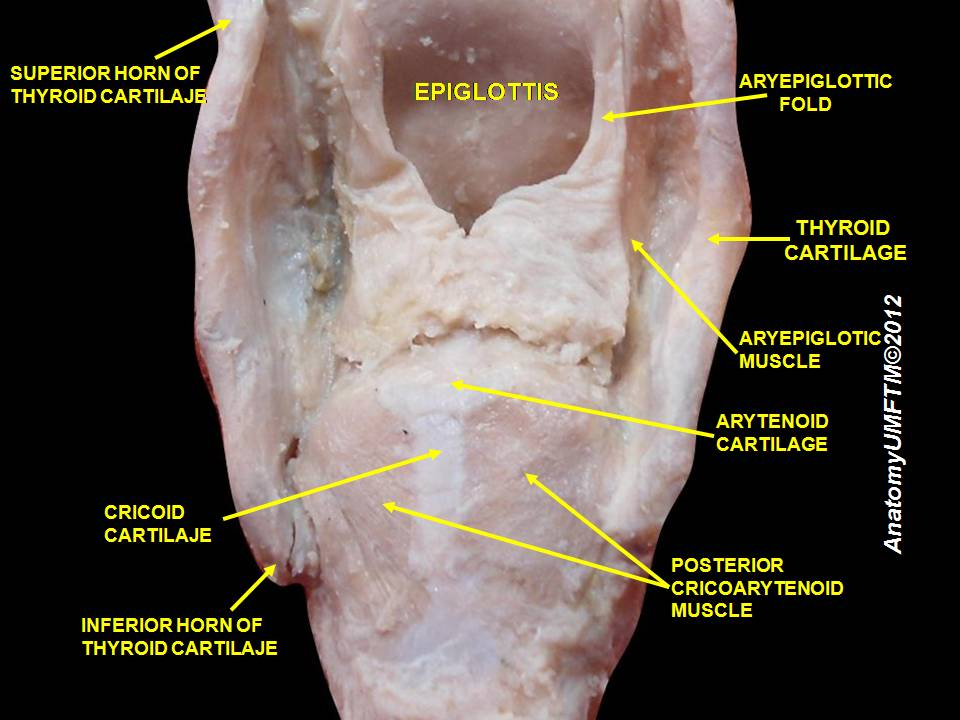
Larynx. Deep dissection. Posterior view.

== See also ==
- Articulatory phonetics
- Electrolarynx
- Histology of the vocal cords
- Origin of speech
