= Hyoepiglottic ligament =

Ligament of the larynx

Details
- From: anterior surface of the epiglottis
- To: upper border of the body of the hyoid bone

Identifiers
- Latin: ligamentum hyoepiglotticum
- TA98: A06.2.07.006
- TA2: 1656
- FMA: 55227

The hyoepiglottic ligament is an extrinsic ligament of the larynx connecting the epiglottis and the hyoid bone.

== Structure ==
The hyoepiglottic ligament is an elastic band connecting the anterior surface of the epiglottis, and the superior border of the body of the hyoid bone.

== Clinical significance ==
It is clinically important in performing direct laryngoscopy with a Macintosh laryngoscope blade; the blade tip is placed in the vallecula and moved anteriorly, which causes the hyoepiglottic ligament to pull the epiglottis anteriorly as well and thus expose the glottis.
