= Harold Hopkins (physicist) =

British physicist (1918–1994)

- Born: 6 December 1918; Leicester, England
- Died: 22 October 1994 (aged 75); Reading, Berkshire, England
- Known for: Zoom lens Fiberscopes; Rod lens endoscopes for keyhole surgery Optics for laserdisc/CD; Borescopes; Wave Theory of Aberrations
- Awards: SPIE Gold Medal (1982); Rumford Medal (1984); Lister Medal (1990); Fellow of the Royal Society
- Scientific career
- Fields: Physics, Optics, Mathematics
- Workplaces: University of Reading; Imperial College London
- Notable students: Ashok Sisodia; María Yzuel

Harold Horace Hopkins FRS (6 December 1918 – 22 October 1994) was a British physicist. His Wave Theory of Aberrations (published by Oxford University Press, 1950) helped provide the mathematical analysis enabling the use of computers to create high-quality lenses. In addition to his theoretical work, his many inventions led to daily use worldwide. These include zoom lenses, coherent fibre-optics, and rod-lens endoscopes, which were used in keyhole surgery. He was the recipient of many awards and was twice nominated for a Nobel Prize.

== Biography ==
Hopkins was born into a poor family in the slums of Leicester in 1918. Due to his work and the support of his family and teachers, he obtained one of two scholarships in Leicestershire, enabling him to attend The Gateway Grammar School. There, he was said to have excelled in the arts, English, History and languages.

He studied physics and mathematics at University College, Leicester, graduated in 1939 with a first, and then began a PhD in nuclear physics in the Department of Physics (now the School of Physics and Astronomy). However, the pursuit of his degree was cancelled on the outbreak of war, and he went to work for Taylor, Taylor & Hobson where he was introduced to optical design.

Hopkins was not given reserved-occupation status, which led to his being called up by the military and briefly trained in blowing up bridges. The error of this placement soon became apparent and he was set to work on designing optical systems for the rest of the war, at the same time working on a thesis for his PhD, which was obtained in 1945.

He began a research fellowship at Imperial College London in 1947, lecturing in optics. He moved to Reading University in 1967. He was said to have believed that his primary responsibility was his teaching and that the research came second.

The development of the mathematical description of the behaviour of optical systems was at the centre of his work. He remained at Reading in the post of professor of applied physical optics until his retirement in 1984. He had conferred on him the honorary fellowships of all the medical Royal Colleges in Britain, together with the highest awards of many of the world's premier scientific bodies, including (in 1973) the Fellowship of the Royal Society. He was awarded the 1990 Lister Medal for his contributions to surgical science. The accompanying Lister Oration, given at the Royal College of Surgeons of England, was delivered on 11 April 1991, and was titled 'The development of the modern endoscopes – present and future prospects'. This award, for his work on endoscopes, was unusual in that normally it is given to someone in the field of medicine. He was awarded the 1978 Frederic Ives Medal by the OSA, where he was also a society Fellow.

== Politics ==
Hopkins is described as being an early member of the Communist Party of Great Britain.

== Major inventions and improvements ==
=== Zoom lenses ===
Following a request in the late 1940's from the BBC, who wanted a single lens to replace the classic 'turret' of different focal length lenses, he produced the now familiar zoom lens. Although there had been earlier attempts to produce a lens which could achieve continuously varying magnification without re-focusing, none of them could provide a good quality image throughout their zooming and aperture ranges. The design of a zoom lens is more complicated and difficult than that of a fixed focal length lens. The performance of the Hopkins' zoom lens revolutionized television images, especially outdoors broadcasts and opened the way to the ubiquitous use of zooming in modern visual media. It was even more remarkable for being produced pre-computer, the ray-tracing calculations instead being performed on desk top electro-mechanical machines such as the Marchant Calculator. Even so, the early zoom lenses fell short of the image quality and brightness of fixed lenses. The application of computer design-programs based on his Wave Theory of Aberrations, in conjunction with new types of glass coatings and manufacturing techniques, has transformed the performance of all types of lenses.

=== Coherent fiber optics, fibroscopes and rod-lens endoscopes ===
These inventions of Hopkins draws upon the ancient Roman technique of heating and drawing out glass into thin and flexible fibres. They also observed that light falling on one end was transmitted to the other due to successive reflections from the internal surface of the fibre. These multiple reflections mix the light beams together, thereby preventing an image from being transmitted by a single fibre – (more accurately, the different path-lengths experienced by individual light-rays alter their relative phases rendering the beam incoherent and thus unable to reconstitute the image). The end result is that the light emerging from a single fibre will be an average of the intensity and colour of the light falling on the incident end.

==== Coherent fibre optics ====
If a bundle of fibres could be arranged such that their ends were in matching positions at either end, then focusing an image on one end of the bundle would produce a pixelated version at the far end which could be viewed via an eyepiece or captured by a camera. A German medical student, Heinrich Lamm produced a crude coherent bundle in the 1930s of perhaps 400 fibres. Many of the fibres were misaligned and it lacked proper imaging optics. It also suffered from leakage where adjacent fibres touched; which further degraded the image. To produce a useful image, the bundle would need to contain not a few hundred but tens of thousands of fibres all correctly aligned. In the early 1950s, Hopkins devised a way to accomplish this.

He proposed winding a single continuous length of fibre in a figure-of-eight around a pair of drums. Then, when sufficient turns had been added, a short section could be sealed in resin, cut through and the whole straightened to produce the required coherent bundle. Having polished the ends, he was then able to add the optics he had designed to provide an objective and eyepiece. Once enclosed in a protective flexible jacket the 'fibroscope' (now more commonly called a fiberscope) was born. Details of this invention were published in papers by Hopkins in Nature in 1954 and Optica Acta in 1955. However, the bare fibres still suffered from light leakage where they touched. At the same time a Dutchman, Abraham van Heel, was also trying to produce coherent bundles and had been researching the idea of cladding each fibre to reduce this 'cross-talk'. He published details of his work in the same issue of Nature. Eventually, a system for cladding fibres with a layer of glass of lower refractive index was developed by Larry Curtis et al., which reduced the leakage to such an extent that the full potential of the fiberscope was realised.

==== Fibroscopes and borescopes ====
Fibroscopes have proved extremely useful both medically and industrially (where the term borescope is commonly used). Other innovations included the use of additional fibres to channel light to the objective end from a powerful external source (typically a xenon arc lamp), thereby achieving the high level of full spectrum illumination needed for detailed viewing and good quality colour photography. At the same time this allowed the fibroscope to remain cool, which was especially important in medical applications. The prior use of a small filament lamp at the tip of the endoscope had left the choice of either viewing in a very dim red light or increasing the light output at the risk of burning the inside of the patient. In the medical application, alongside the improvement to the optics, came the ability to 'steer' the tip via controls in the endoscopist's hands and innovations in remotely operated surgical instruments contained within the body of the endoscope. This beginning of keyhole surgery was equally useful in industry.

==== Rod-lens endoscopes ====
There are physical limits to the image quality of a fibroscope. In modern terminology, a bundle of say 50,000 fibres gives effectively only a 50,000 pixel image – in addition to which, the continued flexing in use, breaks fibres and progressively loses pixels. Eventually so many pixels are lost that the whole bundle must be replaced (at considerable expense). Hopkins realised that any further optical improvement would require a different approach. Previous rigid endoscopes suffered from low light transmittance and poor image quality. The surgical requirement of passing surgical tools as well as the illumination system inside the endoscope tube – which itself is restricted by the dimensions of the human body – left little room for the imaging optics. The tiny lenses of a conventional system required supporting rings that obscured the bulk of the lens area. They were difficult to manufacture and assemble – and optically minimally useful.

The elegant solution that Hopkins devised in the 1960s was to use glass rods to fill the air-spaces between the 'little lenses', which could then be dispensed with altogether. These rods fitted exactly the endoscope's tube – making them self-aligning and requiring of no other support. They were much easier to handle and used the maximum possible diameter. As with the fibroscopes, a bundle of glass-fibers would relay the illumination from a powerful external source. With the appropriate curvature and coatings to the rod ends and optimal choices of glass-types, all calculated and specified by Hopkins, the image quality was transformed – light levels were increased by as much as eightyfold with no heat; resolution of fine detail was finally achieved; colours became true; and diameters as small as a few millimetres were possible. With a high quality 'telescope' of such small diameter, the tools and illumination system could be comfortably housed within an outer tube.

Hopkins patented his lens system in 1959. Seeing promise in this system, Karl Storz GmbH bought the patent and in 1967 began to produce endoscopic instruments. Thus began a partnership between Hopkins and Storz. Whilst there are regions of the body that will always require flexible endoscopes (principally the gastrointestinal tract), the rigid rod-lens endoscopes remain the instrument of choice and have become the enabling factor in modern keyhole surgery.

=== Modulation transfer function ===
Previous to Hopkins' work, the resolution of an optical system was mainly assessed using 3-bar resolution charts, with the limit of resolution being the main criterion. But Harold studied at the University of Besançon with Pierre-Michel Duffieux, who had already begun to lay the foundations of Fourier optics. The seminal paper, which he presented in 1962 when he delivered the Thomas Young Oration of the Institute of Physics, was one of the first to establish the modulation transfer function (MTF) – sometimes called the contrast transfer function (CTF) – as the leading measure of image quality in image-forming optical systems. Briefly, the contrast of the image of a sinusoidal object is defined as the difference in intensities between the peaks and troughs, divided by the sum. The spatial frequency is the reciprocal of the period of the pattern in this image, normally measured in cycles/mm. The contrast, normalised to make the contrast at zero spatial frequency equal to unity, expressed as a function of spatial frequency, is the definition of the modulation transfer function. MTF is still used by optical designers as the principal criterion of image quality, although its measurement in production is less widespread than it once was. It is calculated from the lens data using software such as OSLO, Zemax and Code V.

=== 'Laserdisc and CD' optics ===
Originally an analogue video play-back system, the Philips laserdisc format was adapted to digital in the late 1970s and was the forerunner of the CD and DVD. The digital data is encoded as a series of depressions in a reflective disc. They are arranged along a spiral path that a laser can read sequentially (similar to a stylus following the groove on a vinyl record). The laser must be focused onto, and track this path and the reflected beam must be collected, diverted and measured. The prototype optics to achieve this was an expensive glass-lens arrangement. Hopkins was able to show by a thorough mathematical analysis of the system, that with a carefully calculated geometry, it was possible to use a single piece of transparent moulded-plastic instead. This continues to be a major factor in the low cost of laser disc-readers (such as CD players).

== The Hopkins Building, University of Reading ==
On 12 June 2009, the Hopkins Building was inaugurated by Harold's son, Kelvin Hopkins, the Labour MP for Luton North. Created for biomedical and pharmaceutical research interests of the university, the building was dedicated to honor Hopkins' contributions to the university as one of its leading professors.
