= Thyroepiglottic =

Thyroepiglottic may refer to:

- Thyroepiglottic ligament
- Thyroepiglottic muscle
