= List of viewing instruments =

Type of optical instrument

A viewing instrument is a type of optical instrument that is used to assist viewing or visually examining an object or scenery.

== Types ==
- binoculars
- contact lenses
- cystoscope
- electrotachyscope
- endoscope including oblique-viewing instruments for seeing the digestive system
- eyeglasses
- fibrescope
- finderscope
- fluoroscope
- gastroscope
- gonioscope
- kinetoscope
- laryngoscope
- magnifying glass
- microscope
- ophthalmoscope
- otoscope
- periscope
- phenakistoscope also phenakistiscope
- praxinoscope
- reflector sight
- spectroscope
- spotting scope
- stereoscope
- stroboscope
- tachistoscope
- telescope
- teleidoscope
- viewfinder
