= Epiglottic vallecula =

Space in the larynx

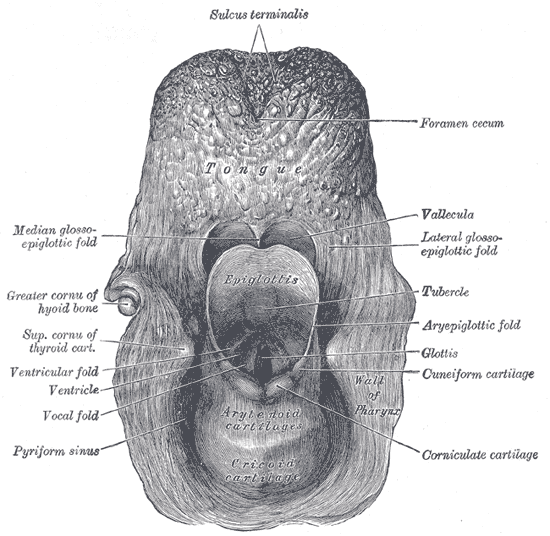
- (Vallecula labeled at center right.)

Details

Identifiers
- Latin: vallecula epiglottica
- TA98: A05.3.01.020
- TA2: 2876
- FMA: 55037

The epiglottic valleculae are paired spaces between the root of the tongue and anterior surface of the epiglottis. Each vallecula is bordered medially by the median glossoepiglottic fold and laterally by two lateral glossoepiglottic folds.

The valleculae can collect saliva to prevent initiation of the swallowing reflex.

The vallecula is an important reference landmark used during tracheal intubation. The procedure requires the blade-tip of a Macintosh-style laryngoscope to be placed as far as possible into the vallecula in order to facilitate directly visualizing the glottis.

== Additional images ==
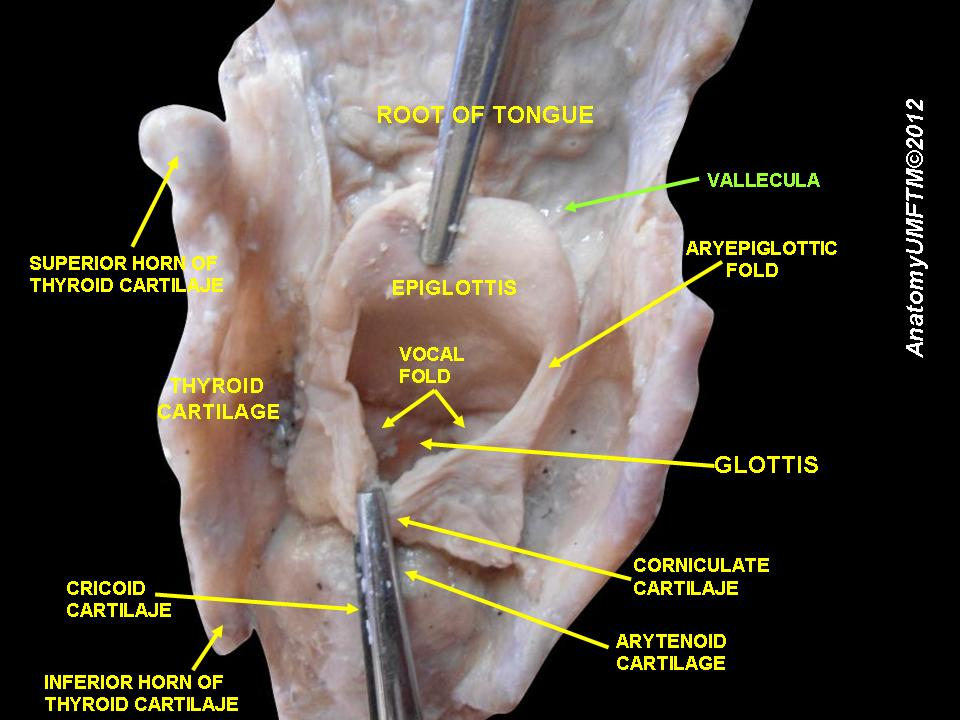
Epiglottic vallecula
