= Karl Storz Endoskope =

German medical device company

Karl Storz SE & Co. KG
- Type: Private
- Industry: Medical technology
- Founded: 1945
- Headquarters: Tuttlingen, Germany
- Key people: Karl-Christian Storz
- Revenue: €2.18 billion (2023)
- Number of employees: 9,800 (2025)
- Website: www.karlstorz.com

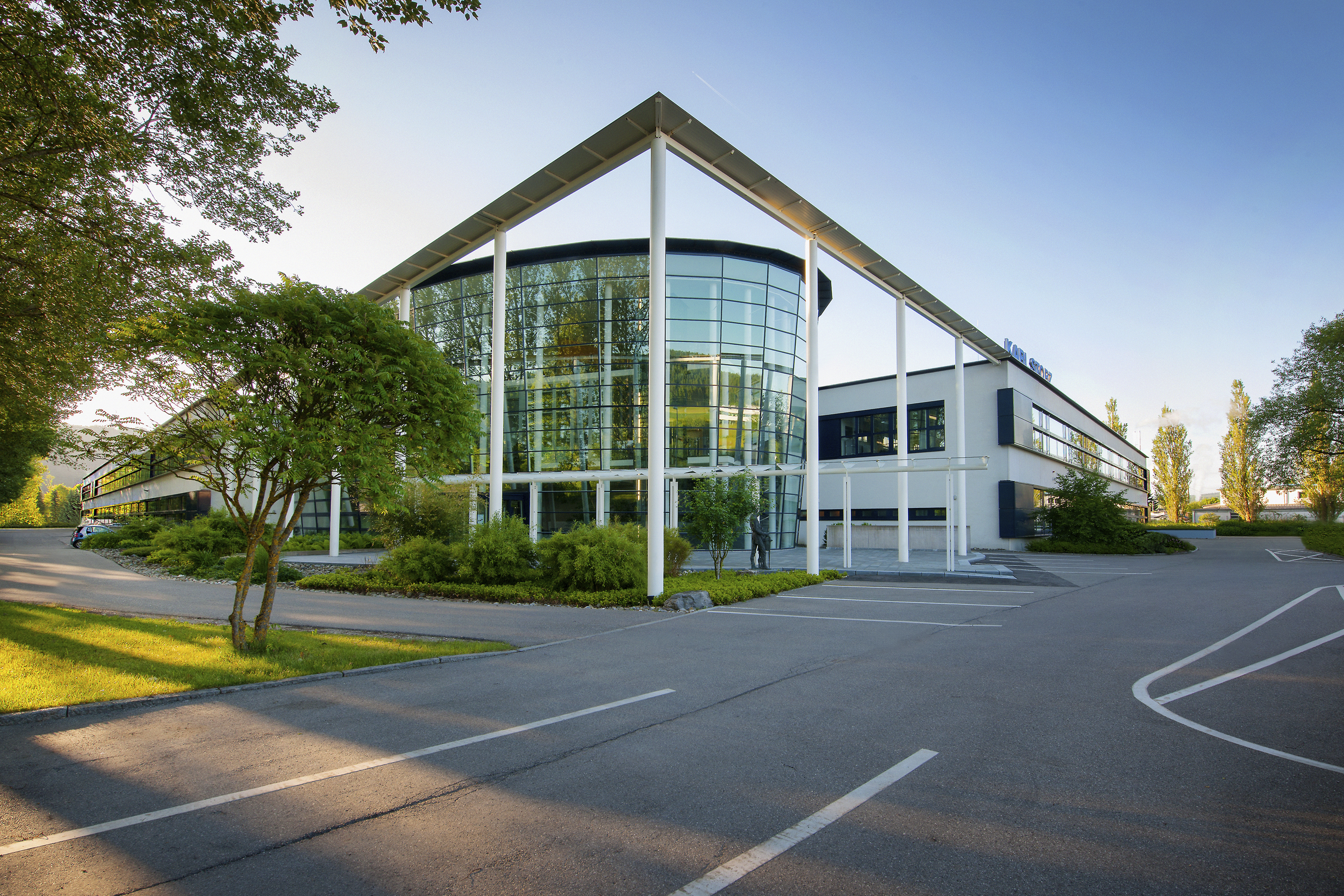
Karl Storz headquarters in Tuttlingen

Karl Storz SE & Co. KG is an internationally operating family-owned company headquartered in Tuttlingen, Baden-Württemberg. The company was founded in 1945 and specialises in the production and distribution of medical instruments and devices. It is recognised as a global leader in human medical instruments in the field of minimally invasive surgery and rigid endoscopes used for examining body cavities.

After the death of founder Karl Storz in 1996, his daughter, Sybill Storz, took over the company’s management. At the beginning of 2019, leadership transitioned to her son, Karl-Christian Storz.

== History ==
=== Foundation and beginnings ===
Karl Storz, a surgical mechanic, founded his company in 1945 in Tuttlingen, initially focusing on the production of instruments and lamps for ear, nose, and throat medicine. In the early 1950s, Karl Storz developed and produced the first endoscopes with a traditional lens system, marking the company's entry into endoscopy. In 1956, he also invented the first extracorporeal electronic flash system for endoscopic photography, which used quartz rods to direct light into the body, significantly improving the quality of endoscopic images. Additionally, in the 1950s, the Clar 55 headlamp, featuring a concave reflector and a tungsten filament bulb, was introduced to the market.

=== Further product launches and expansion ===
In 1960, the company founder Karl Storz invented the cold light source, a light source positioned outside the endoscope and the body, providing higher light intensity than the previously used light bulbs. Together with Harold Hopkins, he developed the rod-lens system for endoscopic image transmission, which was launched in 1965. The advantage of the Hopkins system lies in brighter images, improved image quality (sharpness), a wider field of view, higher objective resolution, better contrast, and enhanced colour reproduction. It also allows for stereoscopic representation. Walter Messerklinger, an Austrian ear, nose, and throat doctor, was one of the first users of the Storz-Hopkins endoscope. He recognised the need for angled scopes, as the direct frontal view of the endoscope was insufficient to see the fissures of the various nasal passages clearly. At his request, Karl Storz developed a range of angled optics, improving the examination of the nose and sinuses. From 1967 onwards, the telescope system was also used in urology for cystoscopies. A miniature flash bulb, positioned near the eyepiece of the telescope, has since provided a well-lit and colour-corrected view of the bladder interior.

In 1969, Karl Storz, together with Harold H. Hopkins, introduced the first arthroscope with a rod-lens system.

In 1970, the company introduced an ultrasonic lithotripter, which could gently disintegrate stones in the urinary tract. A 1971 study showed that the electro hydraulic lithotripsy procedure at the University Urology Clinic in Mainz resulted in the disintegration of uric acid stones in seven patients within 15 to 35 minutes.

As the company grew, its first subsidiary, Karl Storz Endoscopy-America, Inc., was established in the United States of America in 1971. In the mid-1970s, Harold R. Eikelaar, in collaboration with Karl Storz, developed the first arthroscope with a viewing angle of 30°. A significant milestone came in 1987 with the first laparoscopic removal of a gallbladder, marking the advent of minimally invasive surgery. Karl Storz's instruments played a key role in promoting the surgical technique, contributing to the development of the field and expansion of the company. Karl Storz Endoscopy Canada Ltd. was established in December 1995 to offer Canadian customers even more direct support.

After the death of Karl Storz in 1996, his daughter, Sybill, assumed leadership of the company. Under her guidance, the company registered over 100 new patents and achieved annual sales growth rates of 15 to 20 percent.

In 1998, the OR1 networked operating theatre was introduced, and the following year a logistics and training centre was opened in Tuttlingen. In 2000, the company launched the first mobile documentation system for endoscopic use. A year later, the company launched the C-MAC video laryngoscope, followed by a flexible extension in 2003. In 2007, the company launched the C-Mac, a video laryngoscope for emergency medicine.

In the years after 2000, Sybill Storz received a number of awards for her entrepreneurial achievements and her social commitment. In 2007, Karl Storz launched a medical full-HD camera named Image1, which enabled precise visualisation of tissue and vascular structures.

In 2010, the company introduced an extracorporeal visualisation system with a high-definition camera for minimally invasive open surgery.

In February 2011, Karl Storz opened a 1,400-square-metre visitor centre in Tuttlingen, where products from various human medical disciplines, the OR1 operating room, and the Office1 connected treatment room were showcased. In 2013, the company opened a new logistics centre in Neuhausen ob Eck for 300 employees. Additionally, a visitor and training centre was inaugurated at the newly established branch in Berlin, located in the former Kaiserin Augusta Hospital. That same year, the company presented a new camera technology with endoscopic imaging for the full-HD camera Image1 at Medica.

In 2017, it was the subject of several lawsuits concerning deaths following use of morcellators that it sold; in 2014 the FDA had advised that these devices should be withdrawn from the market due to the risk of spreading cancer and while Ethicon, the market leader, had withdrawn their devices, Karl Storz had not. In 2017, it changed its corporate form from GmbH to Societas Europaea.

In 2019, Karl-Christian Storz took over the management of the operational business and his mother Sybill became head of the supervisory board.

=== New developments ===
In 2020, the company, in collaboration with the software firm T1V, developed the application CollaboratOR, which allows all data and digital applications to be displayed on a large screen in the operating room. Also in 2020, Karl Storz launched the technology known as Image1 S Rubina, which is used for intraoperative indocyanine green (ICG) near-infrared fluorescence, for example, during laparoscopic cholecystectomy.

A year later, the company embarked on an extensive construction project to expand the logistics centre at the Neuhausen ob Eck site. Karl Storz is investing a three-figure million sum to build two new production halls, as well as additional offices and parking spaces. According to Karl Storz, this is the largest construction project in the company's history.

In February 2023, the subsidiary Karl Storz VentureOne was founded, with headquarters in Singapore and another location in Munich, focusing on robotic surgery. In the same month, the Irish medical technology company AventaMed was acquired. In July 2023, Karl Storz opened the Mach-Mit-Museum Tutorama (Interactive Museum) in Tuttlingen, covering 800 square metres, which is now operated by the Karl Storz Foundation, established in October 2023. The museum aims to introduce children to science and technology and increase the attractiveness of careers in this field.

In January 2024, Karl Storz announced the acquisition of London-based software manufacturer Innersight Labs Ltd. (ISL). In March of the same year, the augmented reality version of the CollaboratOR application, originally developed in 2020 with T1V, was unveiled for the Apple Vision Pro, capable of displaying 3D content for operations outside the operating room.

In August 2024, the company acquired the robotics firm Asensus Surgical, based in Raleigh, North Carolina, to further expand its robotic surgery division, particularly through the use of Performance-Guided Surgery. In June 2026, Karl Storz announced the discontinuation of the development of the Luna robotic surgery system and phase out the Senhance platform.

== Company structure ==
In addition to the headquarters in Tuttlingen, the family-owned company Karl Storz is represented in over 40 countries and operates more than 70 subsidiaries. In Germany, the company manufactures not only in Tuttlingen but also in Stutensee near Karlsruhe. Other production sites are located in Tallinn (Estonia), Schaffhausen and Widnau (Switzerland), as well as in Charlton and Goleta (United States).

The company employs 9,800 people worldwide, around 3,600 of whom work in the Tuttlingen region. In 2023, Karl Storz employed 175 apprentices and dual students. The company's total revenue for the 2023 financial year amounted to €2.18 billion.

== Products ==
The company offers around 10,000 different products for human medicine as well as veterinary medicine (since 1989). In addition to flexible and rigid endoscopes, Karl Storz supplies software for various medical fields, accessories such as light sources, light cables, and cameras, as well as the so-called integrated operating room, OR1. Due to the wide range of applications for endoscopy, the company's equipment is now used in nearly all medical disciplines.

Karl Storz designs ENT examination rooms equipped with standardised medical equipment. In 2023, 50 of these examination rooms were installed in hospitals of the Bundeswehr. Additionally, the company sets up connected and integrated operating theatres in hospitals worldwide, such as in the Surgical University Hospital of Heidelberg, the Evangelisches Waldkrankenhaus Spandau (Evangelical Forest Hospital in Berlin-Spandau), and the Hospital Alemán in Buenos Aires, Argentina.

== Social engagement ==
In addition to supporting local sporting events, Karl Storz serves as the main sponsor of the Schwenninger DEL team, the Wild Wings.

Since late 2004, Karl Storz has been a member of the UN Global Compact initiative, through which the company commits to responsible international corporate governance and aims to improve global access to basic medical care. For example, in October 2022, the company donated medical equipment to the Ukraine aid initiative of the city of Tuttlingen, and another donation was made in September 2023 to the Phoenix Initiative, a non-profit organisation against the sexual abuse of girls and boys.

The company sponsors the Karl Storz Telemedicine Award, worth €5,000, presented by the German Society for Telemedicine, and is involved in the cross-industry network School-Business. Since 2023, the company has organised the Schools Day together with the Wild Wings, offering students from Year 7 upwards a glimpse into various training careers at Karl Storz in the ice hockey team's stadium. Furthermore, Karl Storz is a partner in a molecular imaging technology initiative supported by the Federal Ministry of Education and Research.

The company also supports the Karl Storz Foundation, established in October 2023 by Sybill and Karl-Christian Storz, which aims to support social and medical projects and is committed to nature and environmental protection.

== Awards (selection) ==
- 2011: Endoscopy Company of the Year for the Asia-Pacific region, awarded by management consultants Frost & Sullivan
- 2013: Patient Safety Award for the development of a fluorescence endoscopic contact probe for more precise interventions in neurosurgery by the German Society for Biomedical Engineering (DGBMT) and the Patient Safety Action Alliance (APS)
- 2014: First place as the most innovative medium-sized company in Germany, awarded by Wirtschaftswoche
- 2014: Innovation of the Year for Image 1 Spies Visualisation Enhancement Tools system, awarded by the Society of Laparoendoscopic Surgeons
- 2017: Innovation award for the C-Mac Pocket Monitor video laryngoscope, awarded by Wirtschaftswoche
- 2019: Red Dot Design Award for HyDome duodenoscopy system
- 2023: 115th place in the overall ranking and 17th place in the pharmaceuticals and medical technology sub-category of the 650 top employers nationwide published by Der Stern magazine

== Literature ==
- Burkhard Riering: Karl Storz – Der Visionär. In: Schwäbische Pioniere. Von der Werkstatt zum Weltunternehmen. Biberacher Verlagsdruckerei, Biberach 2012, ISBN 978-3-943391-16-9, p. 18–27.

== Film ==
- Reise in den Körper – Medizintechnik von Storz in Tuttlingen. Documentary, Germany, 2016, 29:48 min., written and directed by Tamara Spitzing, production: SWR, series: Made in Südwest, first broadcast: 6 April 2016 on SWR.
