= Glossoepiglottic folds =

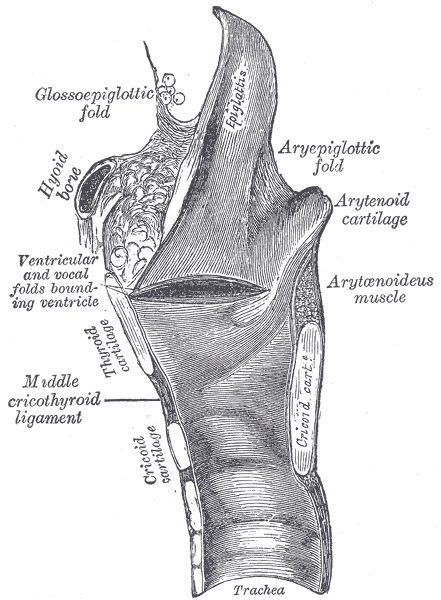
- Sagittal section of the larynx and upper part of the trachea.

Details

Identifiers
- Latin: plica glossoepiglottica
- TA98: A05.3.01.021; A05.3.01.022
- TA2: 2877, 2878
- FMA: 55038

The anterior or lingual surface of the epiglottis is curved forward, and covered on its upper, free part by mucous membrane which is reflected on to the sides and root of the tongue, forming a median and two lateral glossoepiglottic folds; the lateral folds are partly attached to the wall of the pharynx.

== Additional images ==
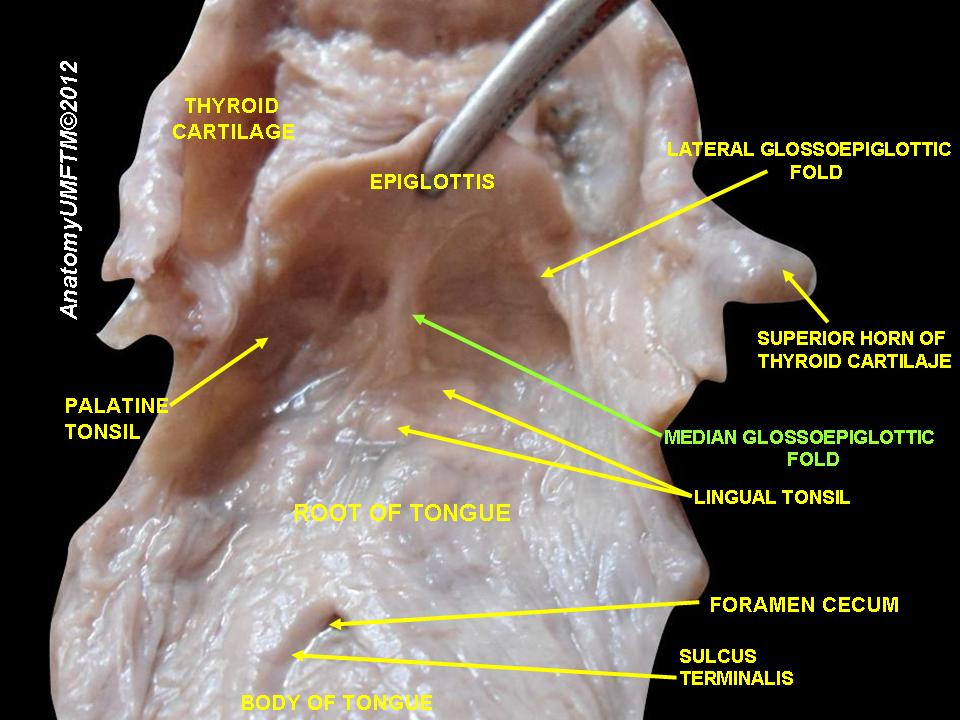
Median glossoepiglottic fold

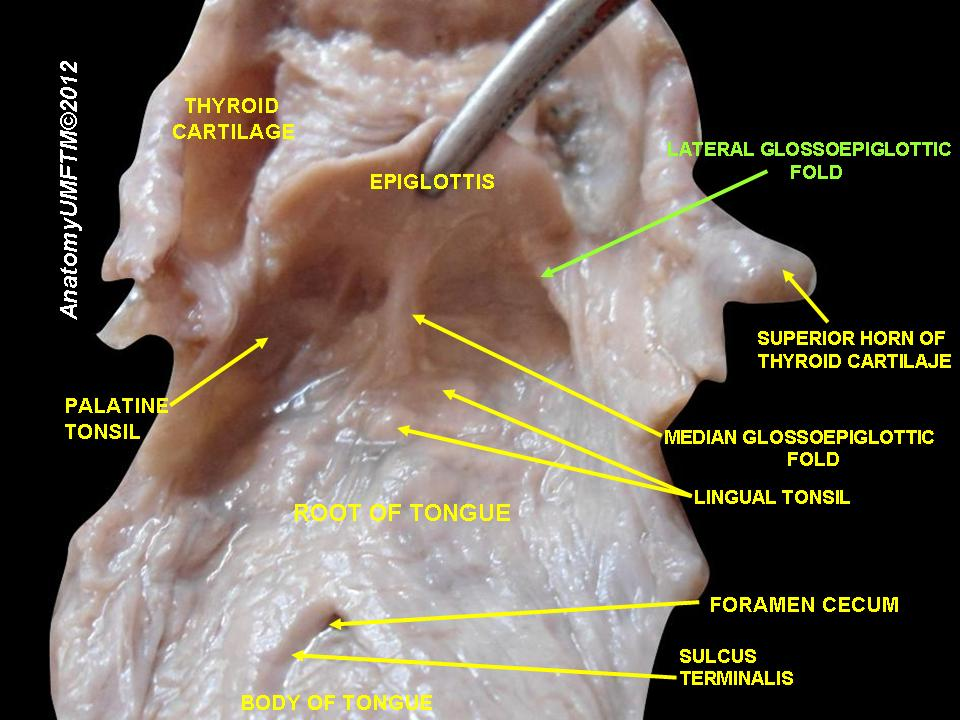
Lateral glossoepiglottic fold

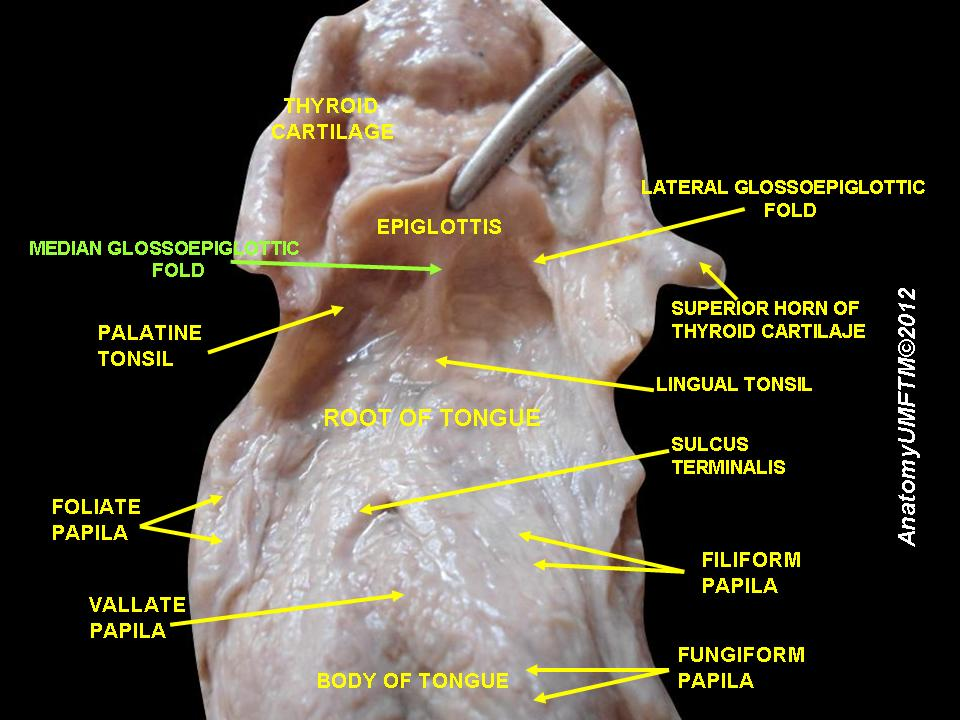
Median glossoepiglottic fold

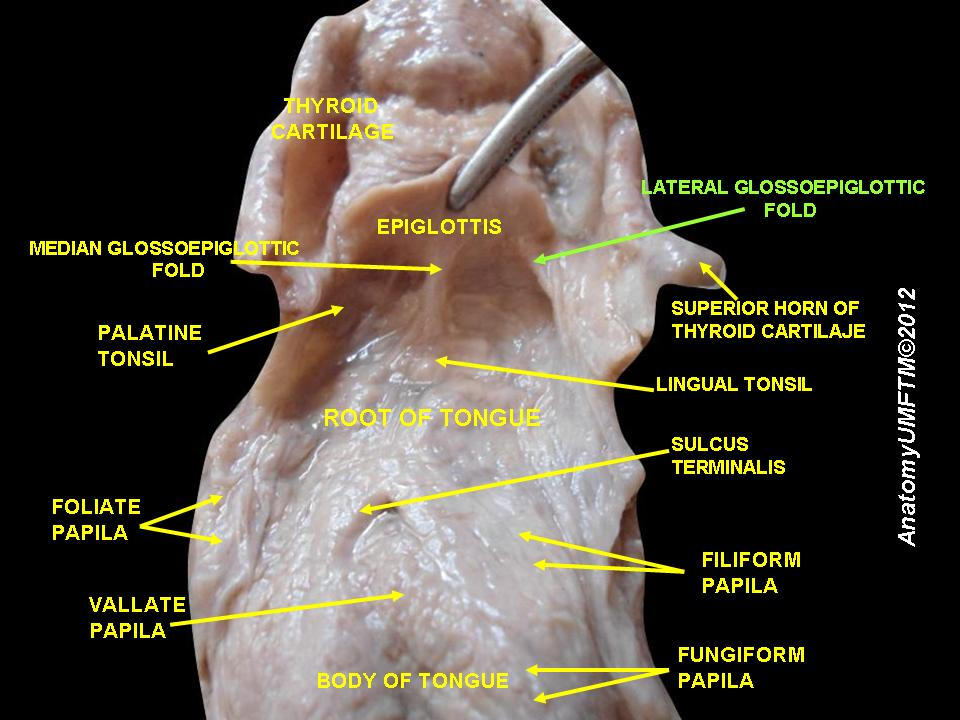
Lateral glossoepiglottic fold

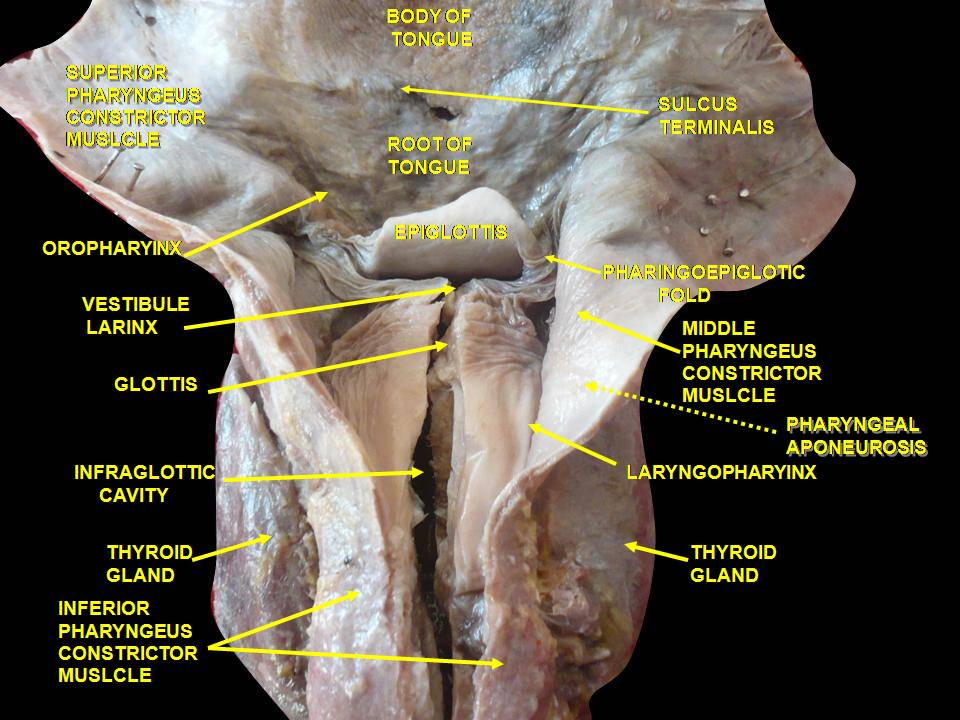
Deep dissection of larynx, pharynx and tongue seen from behind

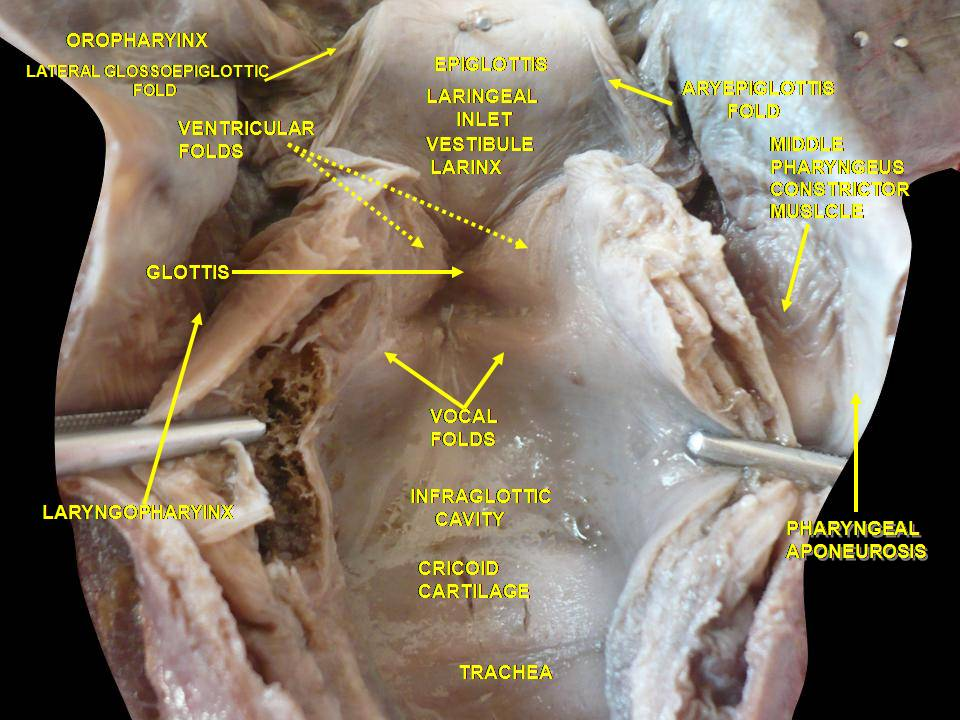
Deep dissection of larynx, pharynx and tongue seen from behind
