= Sybill Storz =

German medical technology executive (1937–2025)

Sybill Storz (1937 – 28 November 2025) was a German businesswoman and daughter of Karl Storz. Between 1996 and 2018, she headed Karl Storz GmbH. She was among the recipients of the Rudolf-Diesel-Medaille for 2004.

== Life and career ==
Storz was born in Leipzig in 1937. In 2013, Storz was awarded the DAS medal from the Difficult Airway Society for expanding the Storz company and registering over 100 patents in the field of airway management. She was praised for her interest in supporting the needs of physicians and for her effective development of communications and training.

Storz died on 28 November 2025, at the age of 88.

== Distinctions civil ==
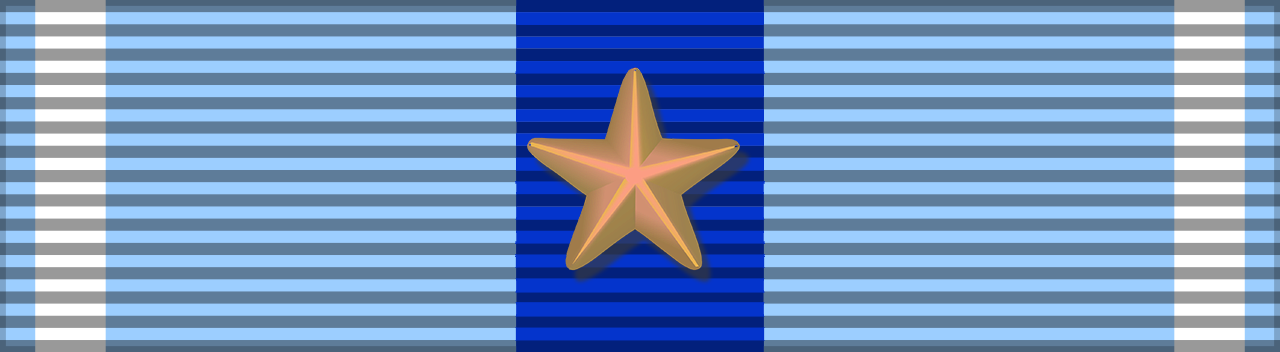
- European Star of Civil and Military Dedication (EEDCM)
