= María Yzuel =

Physicist specializing in Optics

- Born: María Josefa Yzuel Giménez
- Education: University of Zaragoza (BS, PhD)
- Awards: Civil Order of Alfonso X, the Wise (2013)
- Scientific career
- Workplaces: Autonomous University of Barcelona; University of Zaragoza; University of Reading

María Josefa Yzuel Giménez (born 1940) is a professor of physics at the Autonomous University of Barcelona. She has worked in medical optics, diffraction image theory, image quality evaluation and liquid crystals. She served as president of SPIE in 2009.

== Early life and education ==
Yzuel was born in Jaca. She studied physical sciences at the University of Zaragoza, from which she graduated in 1962. She remained there for her doctoral studies, and completed her PhD in 1966. In 1987 Yzuel was awarded a grant from the British Council to travel to the University of Reading. She was the only woman to earn this award and worked under the supervision of Harold Hopkins.

== Research and career ==
In 1971, Yzuel was appointed to the University of Zaragoza, where she was the first woman in Spain to become a professor in physics. In 1983, Yzuel joined the Autonomous University of Barcelona. Yzuel was the first woman to serve as president of the Spanish Optical Society in 1993. She was secretary general of the European Optical Society in 1996.

Yzuel worked on various optical systems as well as optical processing of information. She has demonstrated and developed spatial light modulators for diffractive elements. She retired in 2011, and remains at the Autonomous University of Barcelona as an emeritus professor. She serves on the International Scientific Council of the South Ural State University.

Yzuel is committed to diversity in physics and supports many initiatives that champion women scientists. She has been involved with the SPIE Women in Optics program as well as the Association of Women Researchers and Technologists. She founded the women in physics section of the Royal Spanish Society of Physics.

== Awards and honours ==
Yzuel is a Fellow of The Optical Society, the European Optical Society, and SPIE, and she is a Senior Academician of the Royal Academy of Sciences and Arts of Barcelona.

Her other awards and honours include:

- 2005 SPIE Director's Award
- 2005 University of Warsaw Medal
- 2009 President of SPIE
- 2012 Miguel Hernández University of Elche Honorary Doctorate
- 2013 Civil Order of Alfonso X, the Wise
- 2014 Medal of the Royal Spanish Society of Physics
- 2015 President of the Spanish Committee for the celebration of the International Year of Light
- 2017 University of Alicante Gender Equality Award (igUABlitat prize)
- 2017 University of Granada Honorary Doctorate
- 2021 SPIE President's Award

SPIE have offered a Maria J. Yzuel Educator Award in honour of Yzuel since 2003. In 2018, the Walqa Technology Park honoured Yzuel by naming one of their buildings after her. In 2019, The Institute of Photonic Sciences announced the Maria Yzuel Fellowship Awards for women undergraduate and postgraduate students.

=== Selected publications ===
- Davis, J. A.; Cottrell, D. M.; Campos, J.; Yzuel, M. J.; Moreno, I. (1999). "Encoding amplitude information onto phase-only filters". Applied Optics. 38 (23): 5004–5013. Bibcode:1999ApOpt..38.5004D. doi:10.1364/AO.38.005004. PMID 18323991.
- Marquez, A.; Iemmi, C.; Moreno, I.; Davis, J. A.; Campos, J.; Yzuel, M. J. (2001). "Quantitative prediction of the modulation behavior of twisted nematic liquid crystal displays based on a simple physical model". Optical Engineering. 40 (11): 2558. Bibcode:2001OptEn..40.2558M. doi:10.1117/1.1412228.
- Lizana, A.; Moreno, I.; Márquez, A.; Iemmi, C.; Fernández, E.; Campos, J.; Yzuel, M. J. (2008). "Time fluctuations of the phase modulation in a liquid crystal on silicon display: characterization and effects in diffractive optics". Optics Express. 16 (21): 16711–16722. Bibcode:2008OExpr..1616711M. doi:10.1364/OE.16.016711. hdl:10045/12546. PMID 18852780.
