= Thyroepiglottic ligament =

Ligament of the larynx

Details

Identifiers
- Latin: ligamentum thyreoepiglotticum
- TA98: A06.2.07.005
- TA2: 1655
- FMA: 55230

The thyroepiglottic ligament is an intrinsic ligament of the larynx that connects the epiglottis and the thyroid cartilage.

It connects the stalk of the epiglottis to the angle formed by the two laminæ of the thyroid cartilage, a short distance below the superior thyroid notch.
