= Laryngoscopy =

Endoscopy of the larynx

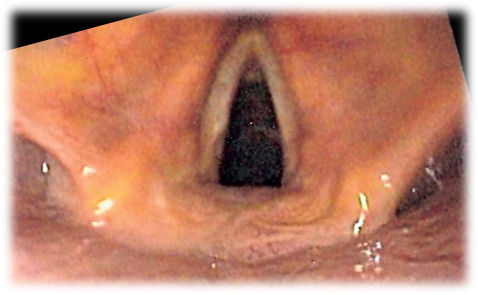
- View of the glottis as seen during laryngoscopy
- ICD-9-CM: 31.42
- MeSH: D007828
- OPS-301 code: 1-610
- MedlinePlus: 007507

Laryngoscopy (/ˌlærɪŋˈɡɒskəpi/) is endoscopy of the larynx, a part of the throat. It is a medical procedure that is used to obtain a view, for example, of the vocal folds and the glottis. Laryngoscopy may be GlideScope to facilitate tracheal intubation during general anaesthesia or cardiopulmonary resuscitation or for surgical procedures on the larynx or other parts of the upper tracheobronchial tree.

== Direct laryngoscopy ==
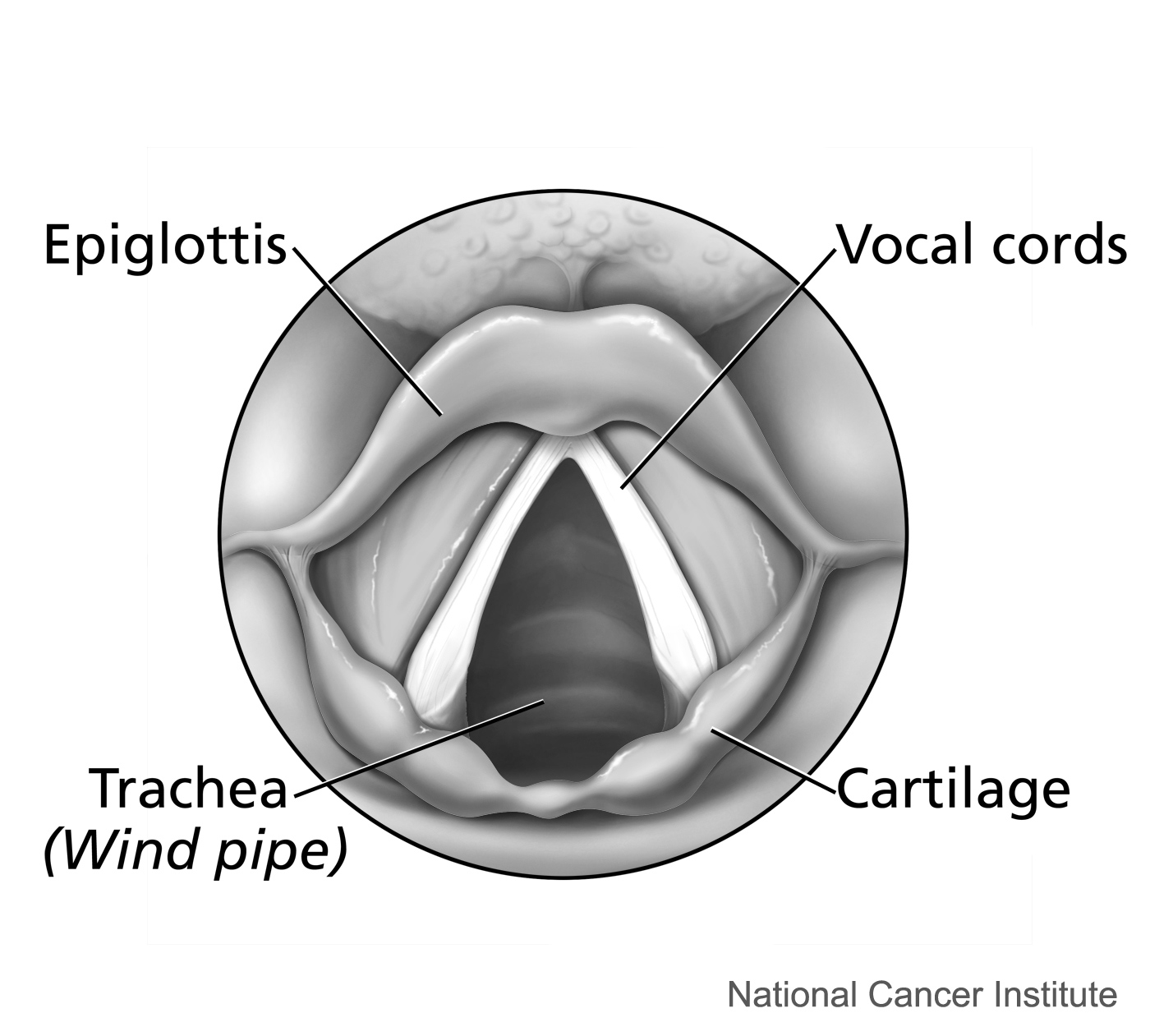
Anatomical parts seen during laryngoscopy

Direct laryngoscopy is carried out (usually) with the patient lying on their back; the laryngoscope is inserted into the mouth on the right side and flipped to the left to trap and move the tongue out of the line of sight, and, depending on the type of blade used, inserted either anterior or posterior to the epiglottis and then lifted with an upwards and forward motion ("away from you and towards the roof "). This move makes a view of the glottis possible.

This procedure is done in an operation theatre with full preparation for resuscitative measures to deal with respiratory distress.

There are at least ten different types of laryngoscope used for this procedure, each of which has a specialized use for the otolaryngologist and medical speech pathologist. This procedure is most often employed by anaesthetists for endotracheal intubation under general anaesthesia, but also in direct diagnostic laryngoscopy with biopsy. It is extremely uncomfortable and is not typically performed on conscious patients, or on patients with an intact gag reflex.

== Indirect laryngoscopy ==
Indirect laryngoscopy is performed whenever the provider visualizes the patient's vocal cords by a means other than obtaining a direct line of sight (e.g. a mirror). For the purpose of intubation, this is facilitated by fiberoptic bronchoscopes, video laryngoscopes, fiberoptic stylets and mirror or prism optically enhanced laryngoscopes.

== History ==
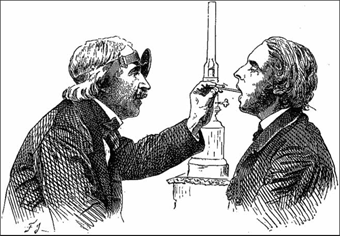
The laryngoscopy. From García, 1884.

Some historians (for example, Morell Mackenzie) credit Benjamin Guy Babington (1794–1866), who called his device the "glottiscope", with the invention of the laryngoscope. Philipp von Bozzini (1773–1809) and Garignard de la Tour were other early physicians to use mouth mirrors to inspect the oropharynx and hypopharynx.

In 1854, the vocal pedagogist Manuel García (1805–1906) became the first man to view the functioning glottis and larynx in a living human. He developed a tool that used two mirrors for which the Sun served as an external light source. Using this device, he was able to observe the function of his own glottic apparatus and the uppermost portion of his trachea. He presented his findings at the Royal Society of London in 1855.

All previous observations of the glottis and larynx had been performed under indirect vision (using mirrors) until 23 April 1895, when Alfred Kirstein (1863–1922) of Germany first described direct visualization of the vocal cords. Kirstein performed the first direct laryngoscopy in Berlin, using an esophagoscope he had modified for this purpose; he called this device an autoscope. It is believed that the death in 1888 of Emperor Frederick III motivated Kirstein to develop the autoscope.

In 1913, Chevalier Jackson was the first to report a high rate of success for the use of direct laryngoscopy as a means to intubate the trachea. Jackson introduced a new laryngoscope blade that had a light source at the distal tip, rather than the proximal light source used by Kirstein. This new blade incorporated a component that the operator could slide out to allow room for passage of an endotracheal tube or bronchoscope.

That same year, Henry Harrington Janeway (1873–1921) published results he had achieved using another new laryngoscope he had recently developed. An American anesthesiologist practicing at Bellevue Hospital in New York City, Janeway believed that direct intratracheal insufflation of volatile anesthetics would provide improved conditions for surgery of the nose, mouth and throat. With this in mind, he developed a laryngoscope designed for the sole purpose of tracheal intubation. Similar to Jackson's device, Janeway's instrument incorporated a distal light source. Unique however was the inclusion of batteries within the handle, a central notch in the blade for maintaining the tracheal tube in the midline of the oropharynx during intubation, and a slight curve to the distal tip of the blade to help guide the tube through the glottis. The success of this design led to its subsequent use in other types of surgery. Janeway was thus instrumental in popularizing the widespread use of direct laryngoscopy and tracheal intubation in the practice of anesthesiology.

== Applications ==
- Helps in intubation during the administration of general anaesthesia or for mechanical ventilation
- Detects causes of voice problems, such as breathing voice, hoarse voice, weak voice, or no voice
- Detects causes of throat and ear pain
- Evaluates difficulty in swallowing: a persistent sensation of lump in the throat, or mucus with blood
- Detects strictures or injury to the throat, or obstructive masses in the airway

== Conventional laryngoscope ==
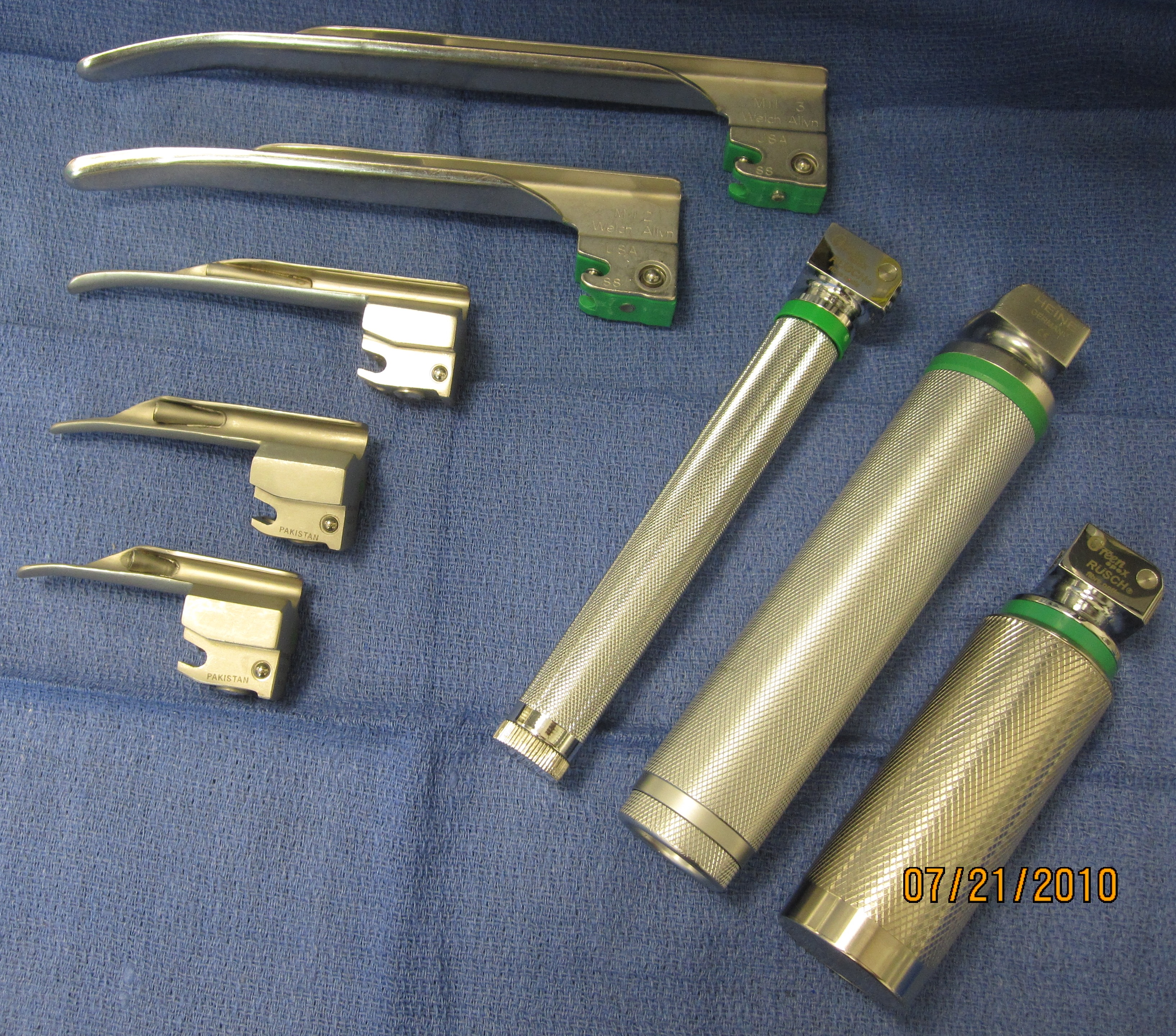
Laryngoscope handles with an assortment of Miller blades (large adult, small adult, pediatric, infant, and neonate)

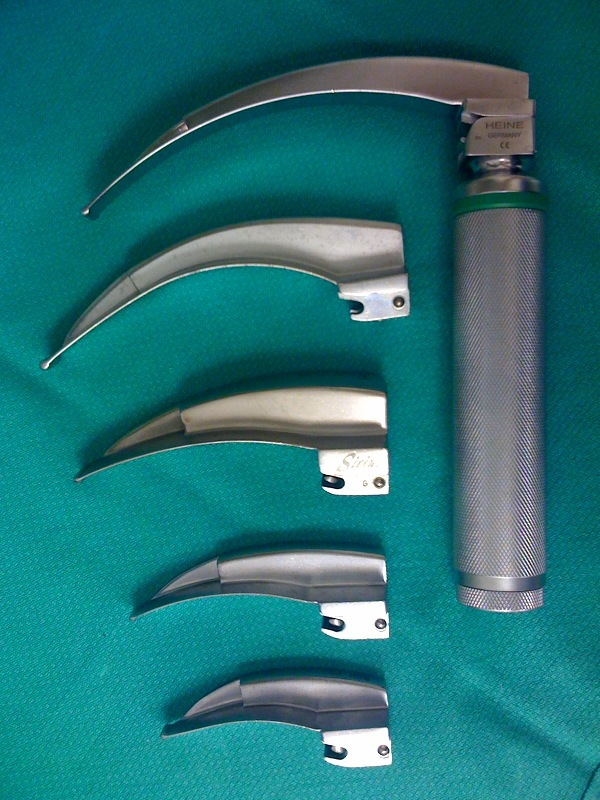
Laryngoscope handle with an assortment of (left-handed) Macintosh blades (large adult, small adult, pediatric, infant, and neonate)

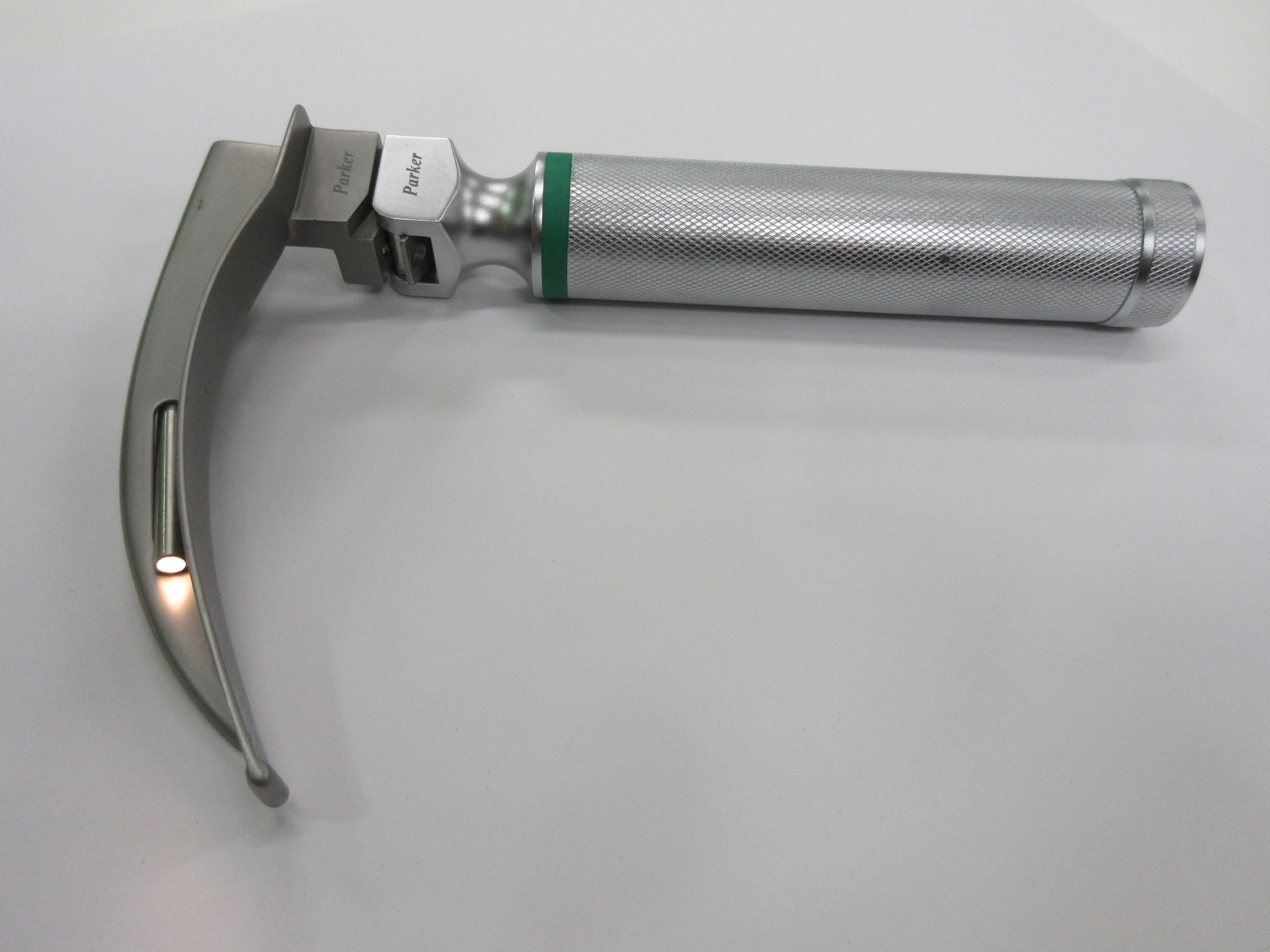
Laryngoscope with a lighted (left-handed) Macintosh blade

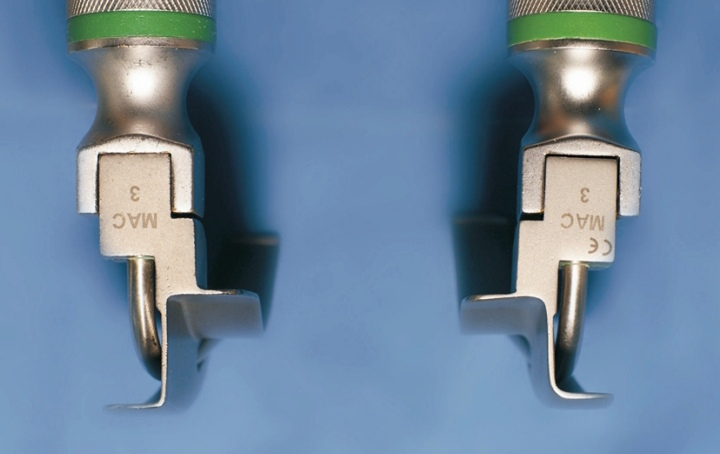
Close-up showing the difference between a right-handed Macintosh blade (left of picture) and a left-handed one, being a left-handed blade the one commonly used. Both are #3 in size (small adult size).

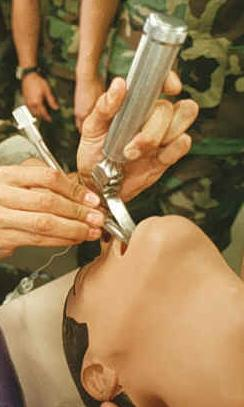
Using a (left-handed) laryngoscope on a training manikin

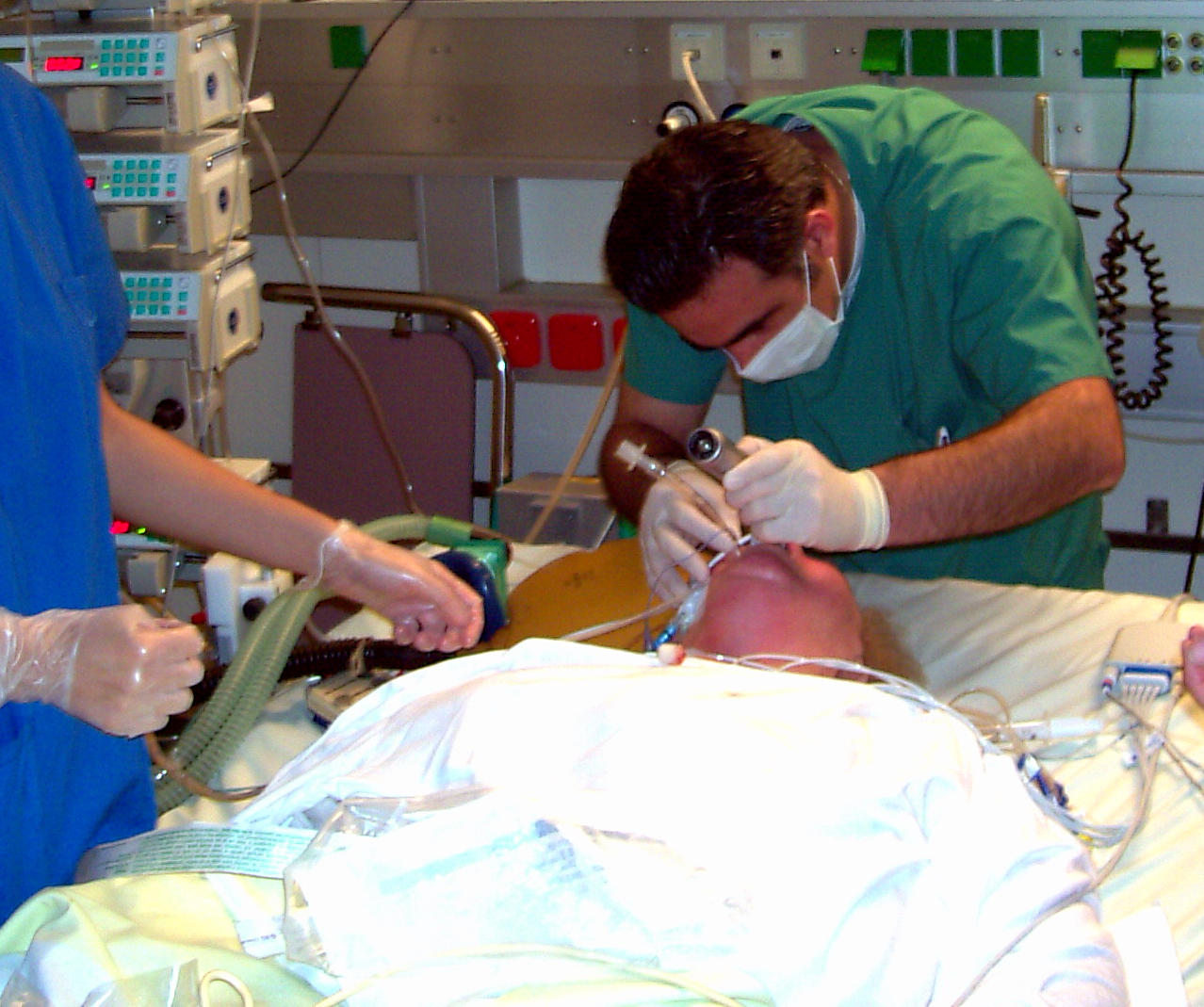
Using a (left-handed) laryngoscope on a living patient

The vast majority of tracheal intubations involve the use of a viewing instrument of one type or another. Since its introduction by Kirstein in 1895, the conventional laryngoscope has been the most popular device used for this purpose. Today, the conventional laryngoscope consists of a handle containing batteries with a light source, and a set of interchangeable blades.

=== Laryngoscope blades ===
Early laryngoscopes used a straight "Magill Blade", and this design is still the standard pattern veterinary laryngoscopes are based upon. However, the blade is difficult to control in adult humans and can cause pressure on the vagus nerve, which can cause unexpected cardiac arrhythmias to spontaneously occur in adults.

Two basic styles of laryngoscope blade are currently commercially available: the curved blade and the straight blade. The Macintosh blade is the most widely used of the curved laryngoscope blades, while the Miller blade is the most popular style of straight blade. Both Miller and Macintosh laryngoscope blades are available in sizes 0 (neonatal) through 4 (large adult). There are many other styles of curved and straight blades (e.g., Phillips, Robertshaw, Sykes, Wisconsin, Wis-Hipple, etc.) with accessories such as mirrors for enlarging the field of view and even ports for the administration of oxygen. These specialty blades are primarily designed for use by anesthetists, most commonly in the operating room. Additionally, paramedics are trained to use direct laryngoscopy to assist with intubation in the field.

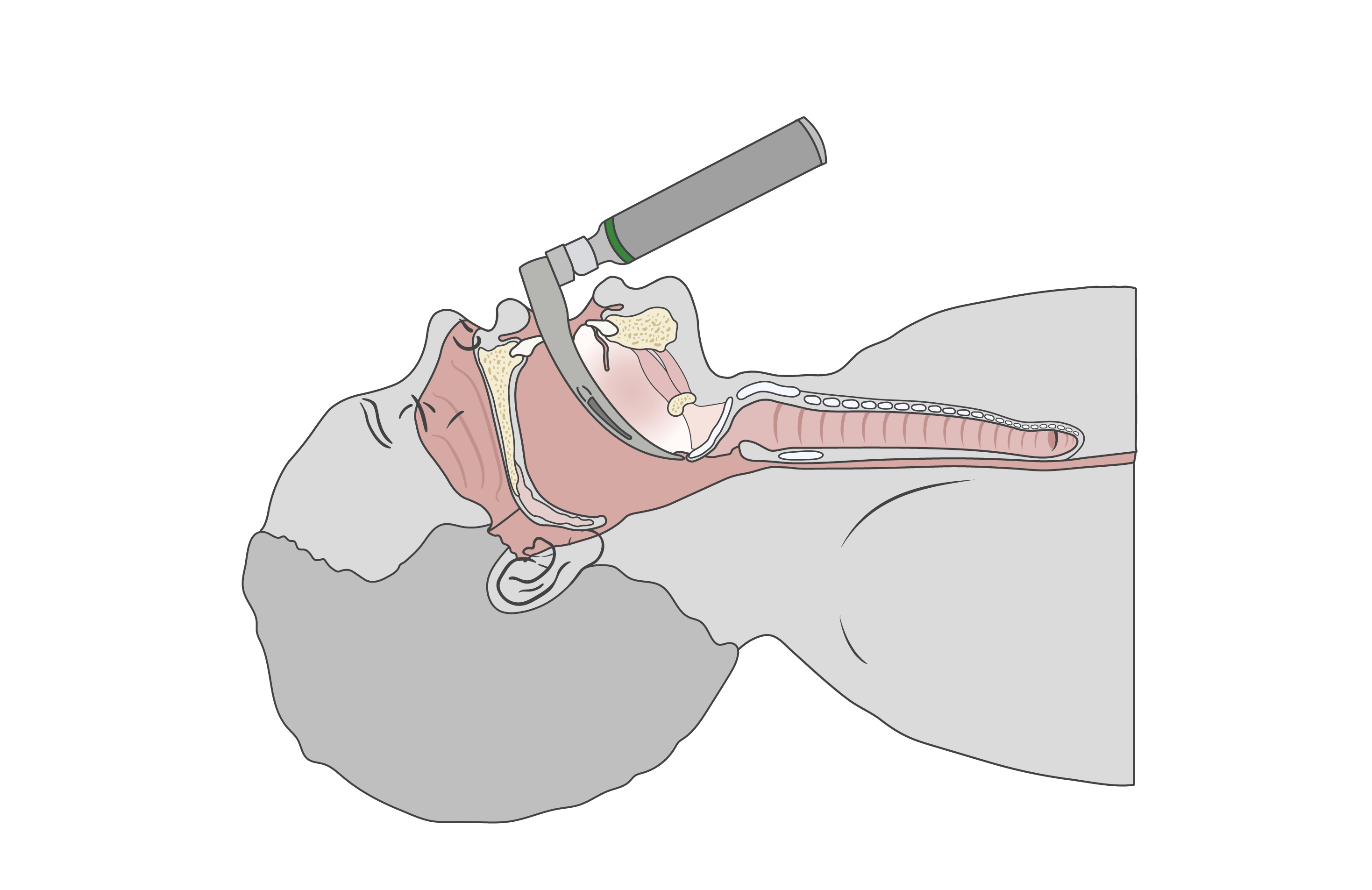
Intubation Macintosh blade sagittal view

The Macintosh blade is positioned in the vallecula, anterior to the epiglottis, lifting it out of the visual pathway, while the Miller blade is positioned posterior to the epiglottis, trapping it while exposing the glottis and vocal folds. Incorrect usage can cause trauma to the front incisors; the correct technique is to displace the chin upwards and forward at the same time, not to use the blade as a lever with the teeth serving as the fulcrum.

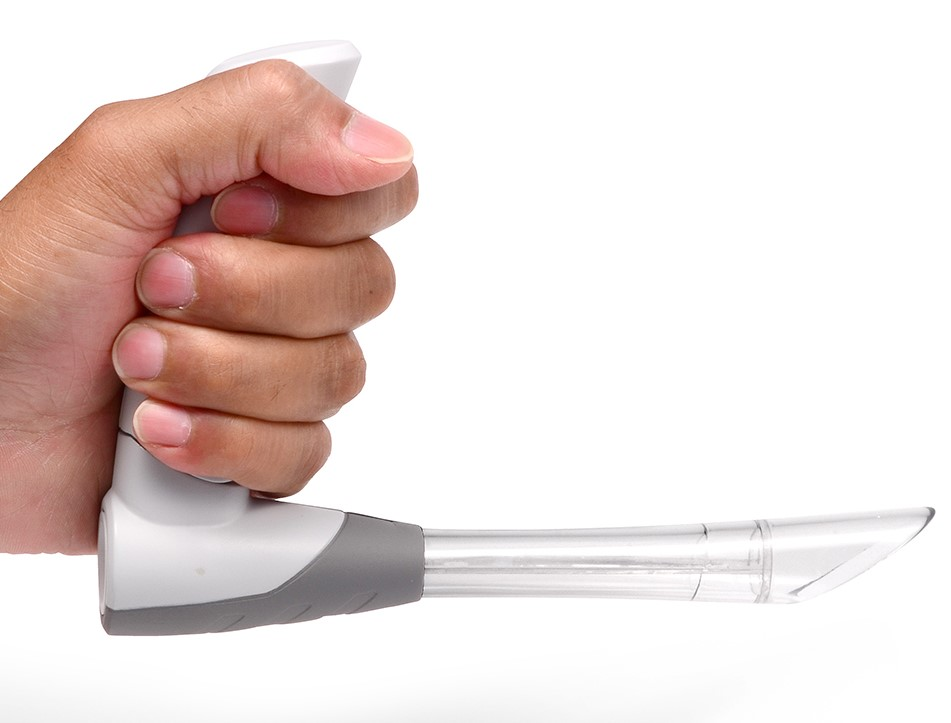
Vie Scope direct line of sight laryngoscope by Adroit Surgical

The Miller, Wisconsin, Wis-Hipple, and Robertshaw blades are commonly used for infants. It is easier to visualize the glottis using these blades than the Macintosh blade in infants, due to the larger size of the epiglottis relative to that of the glottis.

Blade	Named for	Year introduced	Comments
Bainton	Cedric Bainton	1987	Straight tongue with distal 7 cm. tubular, designed specifically for pathologic conditions
Cranwall	George D. Cranton and Barry L. Wall	1963	Straight, no flange
Jackson	Chevalier Jackson		Straight
Janeway	Henry H. Janeway		Straight
Reduced Flange (RF Mac)	George D. Cranton	1999	Curved reduced flange at heel
Macintosh	Robert Macintosh	1943	curved
Magill	Ivan Magill	1921	Straight blade with U-shaped cross section
McCoy		1993	Lever-tip for anterior displacement of the epiglottic vallecula and epiglottis in difficult intubation
Miller	Robert A. Miller	1941	Straight blade with curved tip
Parrott	C.M. Parrott	1951	curved
Phillips		1973	Straight
Robertshaw			Straight
Seward			Straight
Siker		1956	Curved, with integrated mirror
Soper	R.I. Soper	1947	Straight
Vie Scope	N. Vasan	2016	Direct line of sight
Wis-Hipple			Straight
Wisconsin			Straight

== Fiberoptic laryngoscopes ==
Besides the conventional laryngoscopes, many other devices have been developed as alternatives to direct laryngoscopy. These include a number of indirect fiberoptic viewing laryngoscopes such as the flexible fiberoptic bronchoscope. The flexible fiberoptic bronchoscope or rhinoscope can be used for office-based diagnostics or for tracheal intubation. The patient can remain conscious during the procedure, so that the vocal folds can be observed during phonation. Surgical instruments passed through the scope can be used for performing procedures such as biopsies of suspicious masses. These instruments have become indispensable within the otolaryngology, pulmonology and anesthesia communities.

Other available fiberoptic devices include the Bullard scope, UpsherScope, and the WuScope. These devices are widely employed for tracheal intubation, especially in the setting of the difficult intubation (see below).

== Video laryngoscope ==
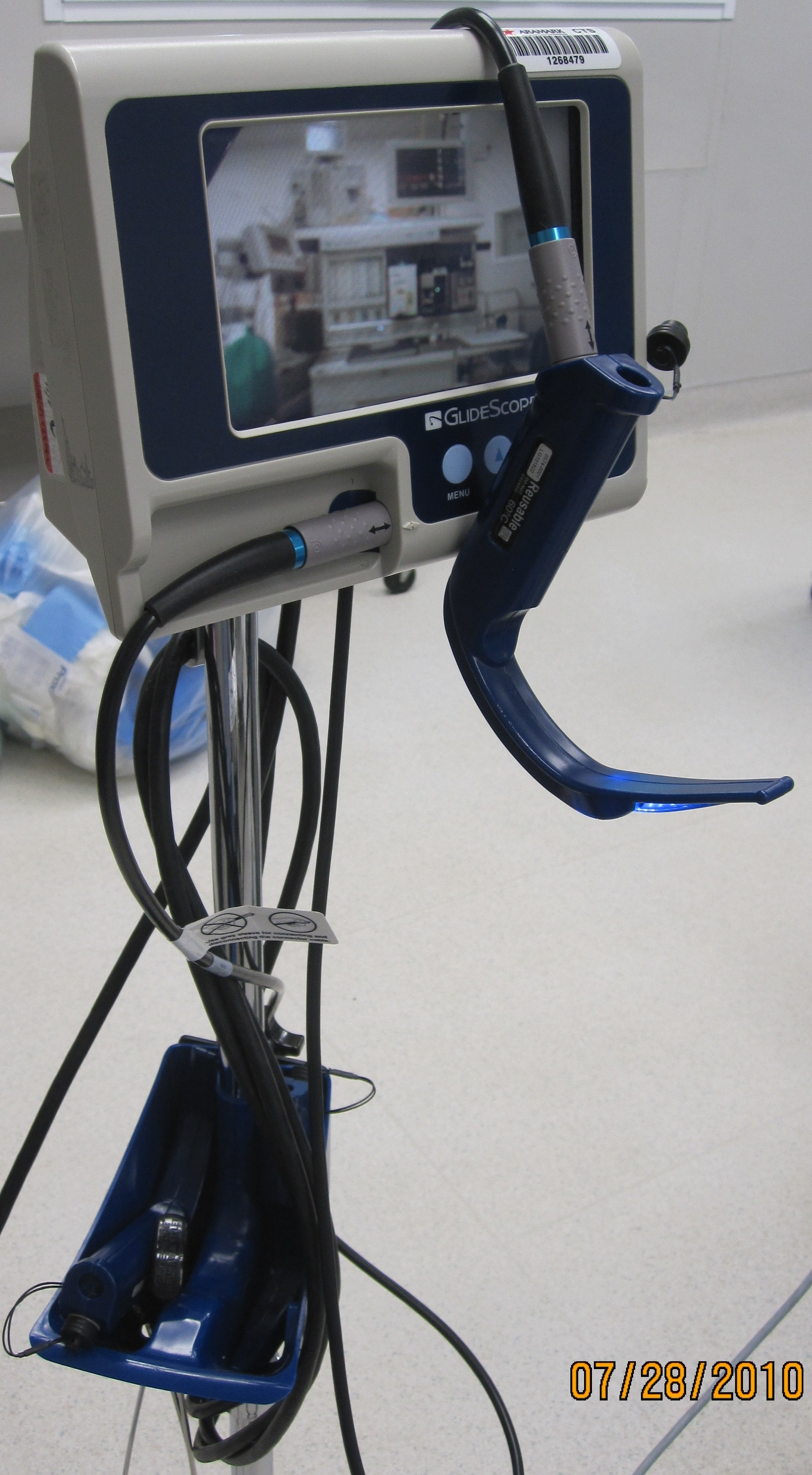
GlideScope video laryngoscope, showing 60-degree angulated blade. The CMOS active pixel sensor (CMOS APS) video camera and light source are located at the point of angulation of the blade. An anesthesia machine is visible on the high resolution LCD monitor.

The conventional direct laryngoscope uses a line of sight provided by a rigid viewing instrument with a light on the blade or intra-oral portion which requires a direct view of the target larynx; this view is clearly seen in 80-90% of attempts. The frequent failure of direct laryngoscopy to provide an adequate view for tracheal intubation led to the development of alternative devices such as the lighted stylet, and a number of indirect fiberoptic viewing laryngoscopes, such as the fiberscope, Bullard scope, Upsher scope, and the WuScope. Though these devices can be effective alternatives to direct laryngoscopy, they each have certain limitations, and none of them is effective under all circumstances. One important limitation commonly associated with these devices is fogging of the lens. In an attempt to address some of these limitations, Jon Berall, a New York City internist and emergency medicine physician, designed the camera screen straight video laryngoscope in 1998. The first true video laryngoscope GlideScope was produced in 1999 and a production version with 60 degree angle, an onboard heater, and a custom screen was first sold in dec 2000. The true video laryngoscope has a camera on the blade with no intervening fiberoptic components. The concept is important because it is simpler to produce and handle the resultant images from CMOS cameras. The integrated camera leads to a series of low cost variants that are not possible with the hybrid fiberoptic units.

=== GlideScope ===
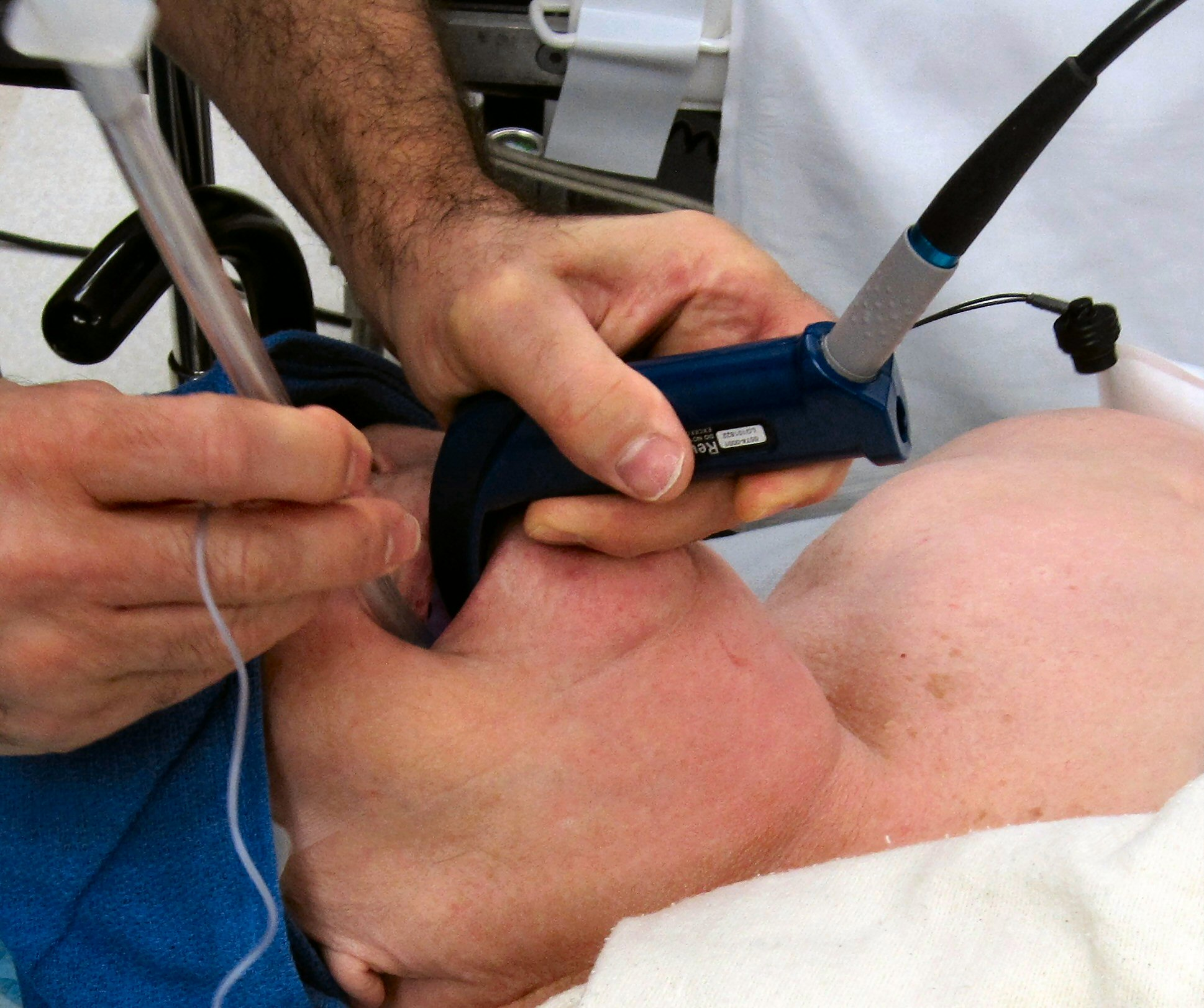
Anesthesiologist using GlideScope video laryngoscope to intubate the trachea of a patient with challenging airway anatomy

In 2001, the GlideScope (designed by vascular and general surgeon John Allen Pacey) became the first commercially available video laryngoscope. It incorporates a high resolution digital camera, connected by a video cable to a high resolution LCD monitor. It can be used for tracheal intubation to provide controlled mechanical ventilation, as well as for removal of foreign bodies from the airway. GlideScope owes its superior results to a combination of five key factors:

- The steep 60-degree angulation of its blade improves the view of the glottis by reducing the requirement for anterior displacement of the tongue.
- The CMOS APS digital camera is located at the point of angulation of the blade (rather than at the tip). This placement allows the operator to more effectively view the field in front of the camera.
- The video camera is recessed for protection from blood and secretions which might otherwise obstruct the view.
- The video camera has a relatively wide viewing angle of 50 degrees.
- The heated lens innovation helps to prevent fogging of the lens, which might otherwise obscure the view.

Tracheal intubation with the GlideScope can be facilitated by the use of the Verathon Stylet, a rigid stylet that is curved to follow the 60° angulation of the blade. To achieve a 99% successful rate of intubation with the GlideScope requires the operator to acquire a new skill set with this stylet.

In a 2003 study, the authors noted that the GlideScope provided adequate vision of the glottis (Cormack and Lehane grade I-II) even when the oral, pharyngeal and laryngeal axes could not be optimally aligned due to the presence of a cervical collar. Despite this significant limitation, the average time to intubate the trachea with the GlideScope was only 38 seconds. In 2005, the first major clinical study comparing the GlideScope to the conventional laryngoscope was published. In 133 patients in whom both GlideScope and conventional laryngoscopy were performed, excellent or good laryngeal exposure was obtained in 124/133 (93%) of GlideScope laryngoscopy patients, compared with only 98/133 (74%) of patients in whom conventional laryngoscopy was used. Intubation was successful in 128/133 (96%) of GlideScope laryngoscopy patients. These early results suggest that this device may be a useful alternative in the management of difficult tracheal intubation.

The Verathon design team later produced the Ranger Video Laryngoscope for a United States Air Force requirement that is now rolling forward into EMS and military use. The Cobalt series of GlideScope then introduced a single-use variant that encompasses weights from 1000 grams to morbid obesity and is successful in many airway syndromes as well. The GlideScope Ranger is a variant designed for use in pre-hospital airway management including air, land, and sea applications. This device weighs 1.5 pounds, and is waterproof as well as airworthy to 20,000 feet altitude. The GlideScope Cobalt is a variant that has a reusable video camera with light-emitting core which has a disposable or single use external shell for prevention of cross infection.

In August 2009, the team at Verathon collaborated with Professor John Sakles from the University of Arizona Emergency Department in achieving the world's first tracheal intubation conducted with the assistance of telemedicine technology. During this demonstration, Sakles and the University of Arizona Telemedicine service guided physicians in a rural hospital as they performed a tracheal intubation using the GlideScope.

=== Other video laryngoscopes ===
Several types of video laryngoscopes are also currently available, such as the HEINE visionPRO, Truview PCD-R Manufactured by Truphatek Israel, Glidescope, McGrath laryngoscope, Daiken Medical Coopdech C-scope VLP-100, the Storz C-Mac, Pentax-AWS(or Airway Scope), Video Macintosh Intubating Laryngoscope System (VMS), the Berci DCI, and the Copilot VL. These laryngoscopes employ a variety of features such as a monitor on the handle and or channels to assist in guiding the endotracheal tube into the trachea. The superior performance of video laryngoscopes in airway management where cervical spine injury is possible has raised the question of whether these scopes should supersede direct laryngoscopy in routine airway management. Further evidence in support of videolaryngoscopy has accumulated over the years, indicating a favourable risk profile for video laryngoscopes over direct laryngoscopes.

== Other noninvasive intubation devices ==
Other "noninvasive" devices which can be employed to assist in tracheal intubation are the laryngeal mask airway (Some types of which may be used as a conduit for endotracheal tube placement), the lighted stylet, and the AirTraq. Due to the widespread availability of such devices, the technique of blind digital intubation of the trachea is rarely practiced today, though it may still be useful in emergency situations under austere conditions such as natural or man-made disasters.

== Complications ==
Cases of mild or severe injury caused by rough and inexperienced use of laryngoscopes have been reported. These include minor damage to the soft tissues within the throat which causes a sore throat after the operation to major injuries to the larynx and pharynx causing permanent scarring, ulceration and abscesses if left untreated. Additionally, there is a risk of causing tooth damage.

== Etymology and pronunciation ==
The word laryngoscopy uses combining forms of laryngo- and -scopy.
