= Fiberscope =

Flexible optical fiber bundle with an eyepiece on one end and a lens on the other

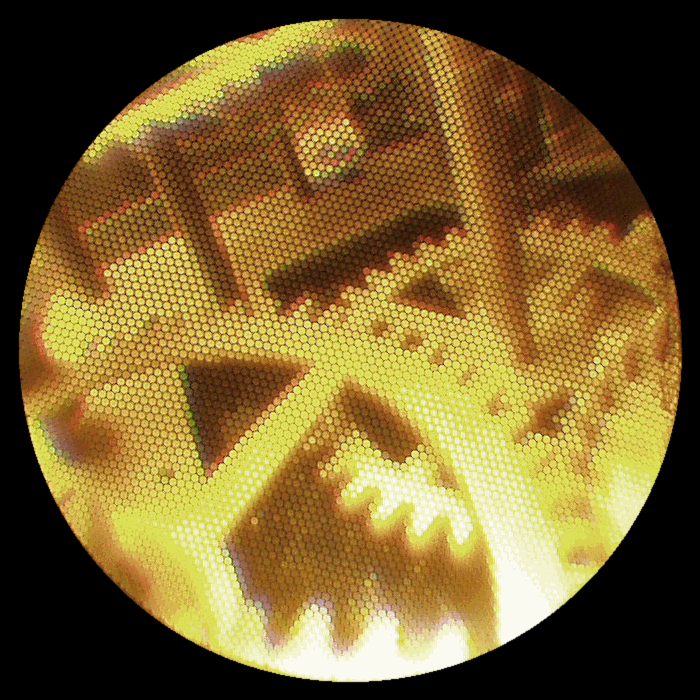
A low quality fiberscope observing the inside of an antique clock mechanism. Note how individual fibers are discernable, as each fiber only relays one part of the image.

A fiberscope is a flexible optical fiber bundle with a lens on one end and an eyepiece or camera on the other. It is used to examine and inspect small, difficult-to-reach places such as the insides of machines, locks, and the human body.

== History ==
Guiding of light by refraction, the principle that makes fiber optics possible, was first demonstrated by Daniel Colladon and Jacques Babinet in Paris in the early 1840s. Then in 1930, Heinrich Lamm, a German medical student, became the first person to put together a bundle of optical fibers to carry an image. These discoveries led to the invention of endoscopes and fiberscopes. In the 1960s the endoscope was upgraded with glass fiber, a flexible material that allowed light to transmit, even when bent. While this provided users with the capability of real-time observation, it did not provide them with the ability to take photographs. In 1964 the fiberscope, the first gastro camera, was invented. It was the first time an endoscope had a camera that could take pictures. This innovation led to more careful observations, and more accurate diagnoses.

== Optics ==
Fiberscopes work by utilizing the science of fiber-optic bundles, which consist of numerous fiber-optic cables. Fiber-optic cables are made of optically pure glass and are as thin as a human’s hair. The three main components of a fiber-optic cable are:

- core – the center made of high purity glass
- cladding – the outer material surrounding the core that prevents light from leaking
- buffer coating – the protective plastic coating

The following are the two different types of fiber-optic bundles in a fiberscope:

- illumination bundle – designed to carry light to the area in front of the lens
- imaging bundle – designed to carry an image from the lens to the eyepiece

=== Total internal reflection ===
Fiber-optic cables use total internal reflection to carry information. When light travels from one medium to another it is refracted. If the light is traveling from a less dense medium to a dense medium it is refracted away from the normal. The opposite applies if the light is traveling from a dense medium to a less dense medium. In optic cables, light travels through the dense glass core (high refractive index) by constantly reflecting from the less dense cladding (lower refractive index). This happens because the surface of the core acts like a perfect mirror and the angle of the light is always larger than the critical angle.

== Components ==
- Eyepiece – Magnifies the image carried back by the imaging bundle so the human eye can view it.
- Imaging bundle – Continuous strand of flexible glass fibers that transmit the image to the eyepiece.
- Distal lens – The combination of micro lenses that take images and focus them into the small imaging bundle.
- Illumination system – A fiber optic light guide that relays light from the source to the target area
- Articulation system – The ability of the user to control the movement of the bending section of the fiberscope that is directly attached to the distal lens.
- Fiberscope body – The control section that is designed to help aide one hand operation.
- Insertion tube – Most of the length of the fiberscope, made to be durable and flexible. This protects the optical fiber bundle and the articulation cables.
- Bending section – The most flexible part of the fiberscope, it connects the insertion tube to the distal viewing section.
- Distal section – Where the ending points of both the illumination and imaging fiber bundle are.

== Medical applications ==
Fiberscopes are used in the medical field as a tool to help doctors and surgeons examine problems in a patient’s body without having to make large incisions. This procedure is called an endoscopy. Doctors use this when they suspect that a patient’s organ is infected, damaged, or cancerous. There are numerous types based on the area of the body being examined. They include:

- Arthroscopy – Joints
- Bronchoscopy – Lungs
- Colonoscopy – Colon
- Cystoscopy – Bladder
- Enteroscopy – Small Intestine
- Hysteroscopy – Uterus
- Laparoscopy – Abdomen/Pelvis
- Laryngoscopy – Larynx (voice box)
- Mediastinoscopy – Area between lungs
- Upper Gastrointestinal Endoscopy – Esophagus and upper intestinal tract

Although any medical technique has its potential risks, using a fiberscope for endoscopy has a very low risk of causing infection and blood loss.

== Other applications ==
Locksmiths use fiberscopes to check the position of pins. Technicians and inspectors use fiberscopes to look at the inside of machines without having to disassemble them. Fiberscopes can also be used in a military or police application to check beneath doors or around corners, or otherwise perform surveillance or reconnaissance.

== In popular media ==
- The 1982 film Who Dares Wins, about the Special Air Service, depicted the use of fiberscopes in counterterrorism.
- Fiberscopes are an important tool in tactical shooter video games such as Tom Clancy's Rainbow Six, Splinter Cell, SWAT, Ready or Not, and Door Kickers, where they are used to check under doors or around corners without revealing the player's position or exposing them to enemy attack.

== See also ==
- Borescope
- Endoscope
- Ulexite or "TV rock", a naturally occurring fiber bundle
- Hidden camera
