= Epiglottis =

Flap in the throat protecting the windpipe

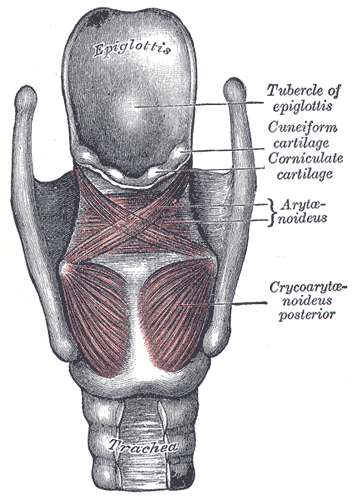
- View of the larynx from behind. The epiglottis is the structure at the top of the image.

Details
- Precursor: Fourth pharyngeal arch
- Function: Prevent food from entering the respiratory tract

Identifiers
- Latin: epiglottis
- Greek: ἐπιγλωττίς
- MeSH: D004825
- TA98: A06.2.07.001
- TA2: 3190
- FMA: 55130

The epiglottis (pl.: epiglottises or epiglottides) is a leaf-shaped flap in the throat that prevents food and water from entering the trachea and the lungs. It stays open during breathing, allowing air into the larynx. During swallowing, it closes to prevent aspiration of food into the lungs, forcing the swallowed liquids or food to go along the esophagus toward the stomach instead. It is thus the valve that diverts passage to either the trachea or the esophagus.

The epiglottis is made of elastic cartilage covered with a mucous membrane, attached to the entrance of the larynx. It projects upwards and backwards behind the tongue and the hyoid bone.

The epiglottis may be inflamed in a condition called epiglottitis, which is most commonly due to the vaccine-preventable bacterium Haemophilus influenzae. Dysfunction may cause the inhalation of food, called aspiration, which may lead to pneumonia or airway obstruction. The epiglottis is also an important landmark for intubation.

The epiglottis has been identified as early as Aristotle, and gets its name from being above the glottis (epi- + glottis).

== Structure ==
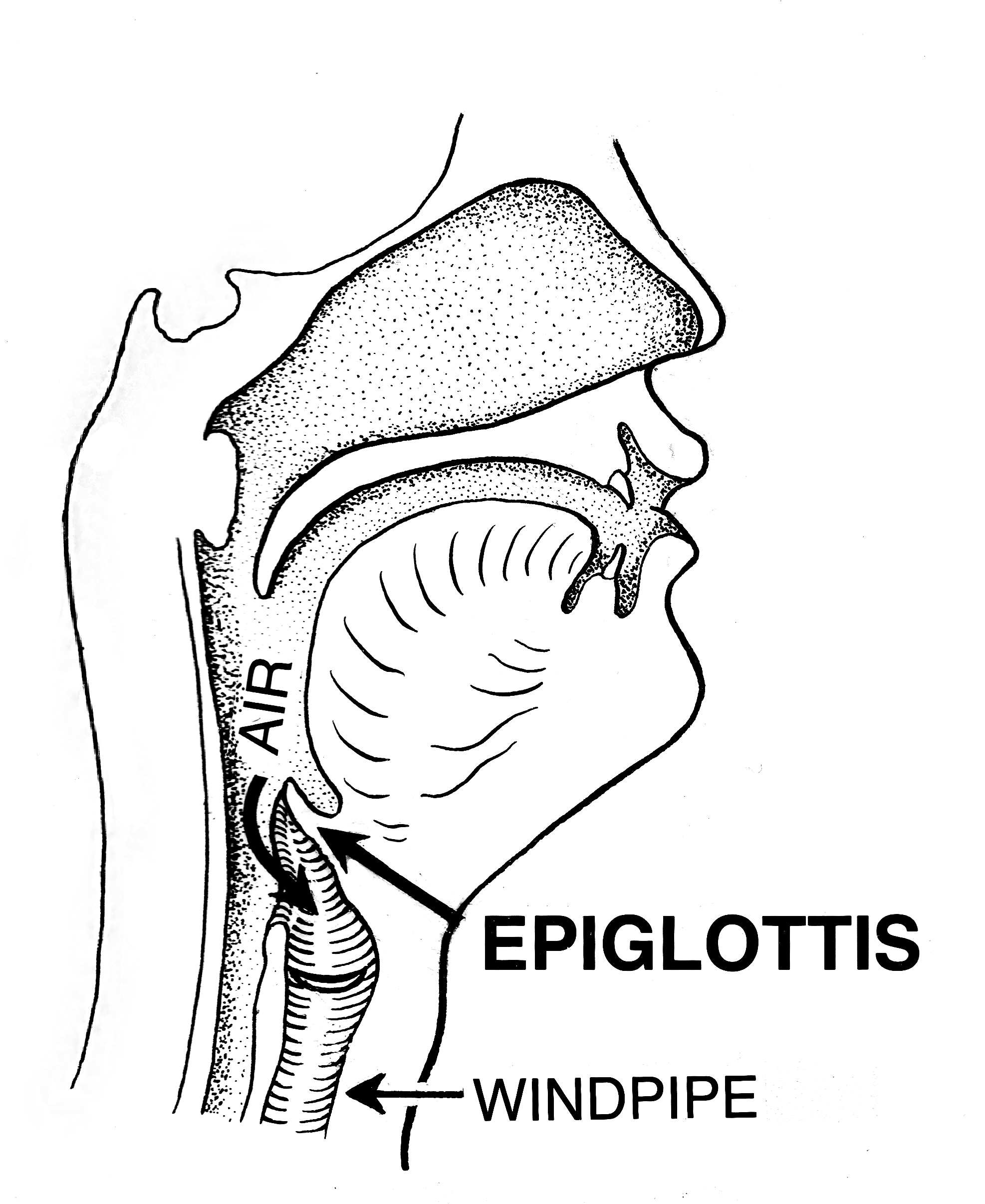
Location of the epiglottis

The epiglottis sits at the entrance of the larynx. It is shaped like a leaf of purslane and has a free upper part that rests behind the tongue, and a lower stalk (Latin: petiolus). The stalk originates from the back surface of the thyroid cartilage, connected by a thyroepiglottic ligament. At the sides, the stalk is connected to the arytenoid cartilages at the walls of the larynx by folds.

The epiglottis originates at the entrance of the larynx, and is attached to the hyoid bone. From there, it projects upwards and backwards behind the tongue. The space between the epiglottis and the tongue is called the vallecula.

=== Microanatomy ===
The epiglottis has two surfaces; a forward-facing anterior surface, and a posterior surface facing the larynx. The forward-facing surface is covered with several layers of thin cells (stratified squamous epithelium), and is not covered with keratin, the same surface as the back of the tongue. The back surface is covered in a layer of column-shaped cells with cilia, similar to the rest of the respiratory tract. It also has mucus-secreting goblet cells. There is an intermediate zone between these surfaces that contains cells that transition in shape. The body of the epiglottis consists of elastic cartilage.

=== Development ===
The epiglottis arises from the fourth pharyngeal arch. It can be seen as a distinct structure later than the other cartilage of the pharynx, visible around the fifth month of development. The position of the epiglottis also changes with ageing. In infants, it touches the soft palate, whereas in adults, its position is lower.

=== Variation ===
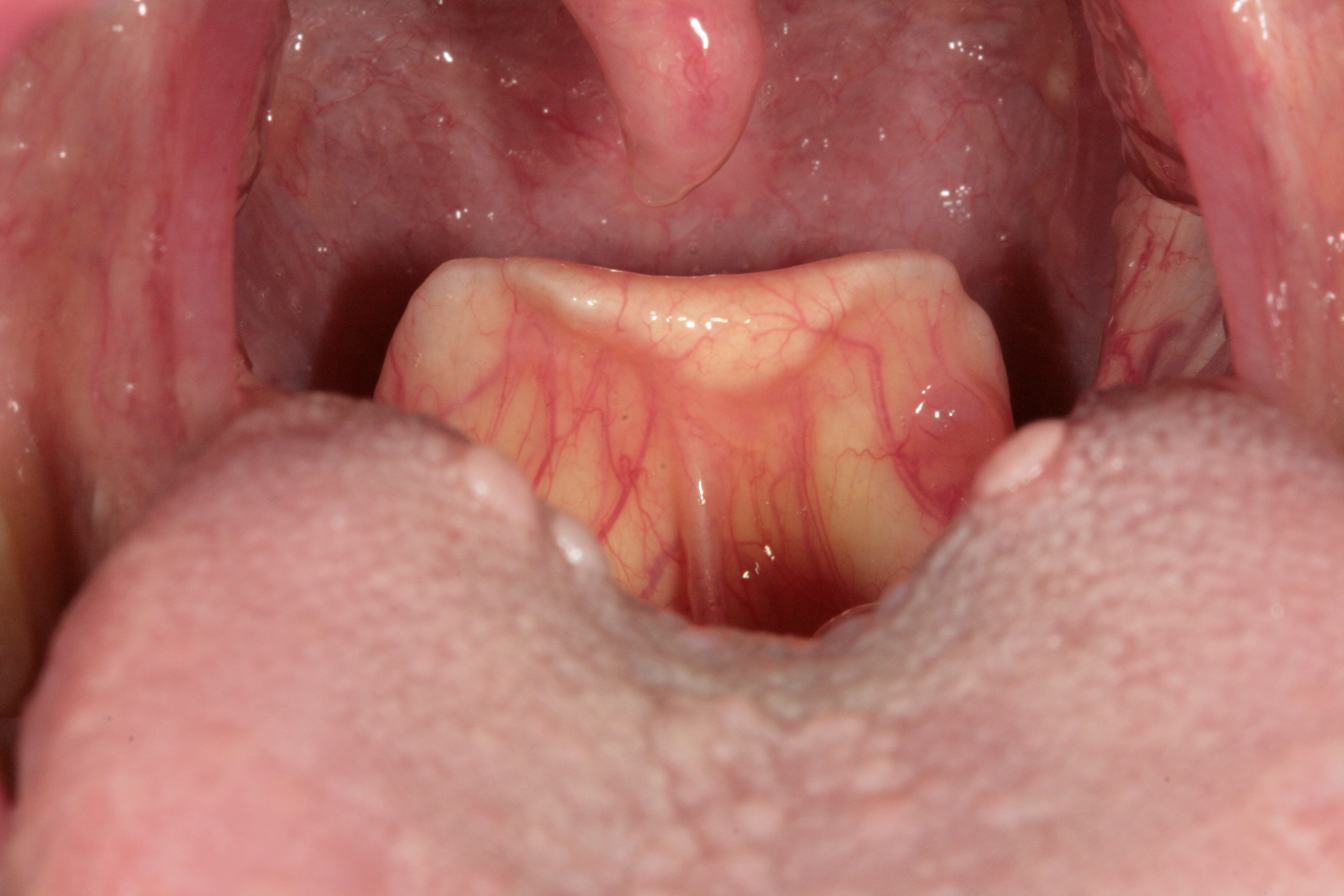
A high rising epiglottis (with forward-facing anterior surface being visible)

A high-rising epiglottis is a normal anatomical variation, visible during an examination of the mouth. It does not cause any serious problem apart from maybe a mild sensation of a foreign body in the throat. It is seen more often in children than adults and does not need any medical or surgical intervention. The front surface of the epiglottis is occasionally notched.

== Function ==
The epiglottis is normally pointed upward during breathing with its underside functioning as part of the pharynx. There are taste buds on the epiglottis.

=== Swallowing ===
During swallowing, the epiglottis bends backwards, folding over the entrance to the trachea, and preventing food from going into it. The folding backwards is a complex movement the causes of which are not completely understood. It is likely that during swallowing the hyoid bone and the larynx move upward and forward, which increases passive pressure from the back of the tongue; the aryepiglottic muscles contract; the passive weight of the food pushes down; and the laryngeal and thyroarytenoid muscles contract. The consequence of this is that during swallowing the bent epiglottis blocks off the trachea, preventing food from going into it; food instead travels down the esophagus, which is behind it.

=== Speech sounds ===
In many languages, the epiglottis is not essential for producing sounds. In some languages, the epiglottis is used to produce epiglottal consonant speech sounds, though this sound-type is rather rare.

== Clinical significance ==
=== Inflammation ===
The inflammation of the epiglottis is known as epiglottitis. Epiglottitis is mainly caused by Haemophilus influenzae. A person with epiglottitis may have a fever, sore throat, difficulty swallowing, and difficulty breathing. For this reason, acute epiglottitis is considered a medical emergency, because of the risk of obstruction of the pharynx. Epiglottitis is often managed with antibiotics, inhaled aerosolised epinephrine to act as a bronchodilator, and may require tracheal intubation or a tracheostomy if breathing is difficult.

The incidence of epiglottitis has decreased significantly in countries where vaccination against Haemophilus influenzae is administered.

=== Aspiration ===
When food or other objects travel down the respiratory tract rather than down the esophagus to the stomach, this is called aspiration. This can lead to the obstruction of airways, inflammation of lung tissue, and aspiration pneumonia; and in the long term, atelectasis and bronchiectasis. One reason aspiration can occur is because of failure of the epiglottis to close completely.

If food or liquid enters the airway due to the epiglottis failing to close properly, throat-clearing or a cough reflex may occur to protect the respiratory system and expel material from the airway. Where there is impairment in laryngeal vestibule sensation, silent aspiration (entry of material to the airway that does not result in a cough reflex) may occur.

=== Other ===
The epiglottis and vallecula are important anatomical landmarks in intubation. Abnormal positioning of the epiglottis is a rare cause of obstructive sleep apnoea.

== Other animals ==
The epiglottis is present in mammals, including land mammals and cetaceans, also as a cartilaginous structure. Like in humans, it functions to prevent entry of food into the trachea during swallowing. The position of the larynx is flat in mice and other rodents, as well as rabbits. For this reason, because the epiglottis is located behind the soft palate in rabbits, they are obligate nose breathers, as are mice and other rodents. In rodents and mice, there is a unique pouch in front of the epiglottis, and the epiglottis is commonly injured by inhaled substances, particularly at the transition zone between the flattened and cuboidal epithelium. It is also common to see taste buds on the epiglottis in these species.

== History ==
The epiglottis was noted by Aristotle, although the epiglottis' function was first defined by Vesalius in 1543. The word has Greek roots. The epiglottis gets its name from being above (Ancient Greek: ἐπί, romanized: epi-) the glottis (Ancient Greek: γλωττίς, romanized: glottis, lit. 'tongue').

== Additional images ==
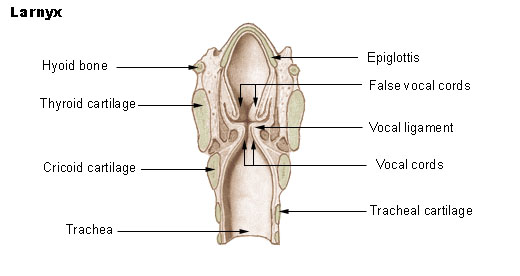
Cross-section of the larynx, with structures including the epiglottis labelled

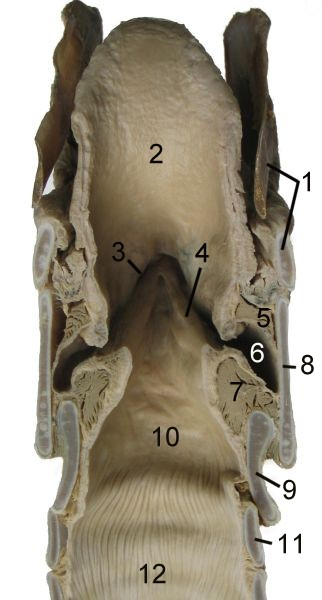
Cross-section of the larynx of a horse. The epiglottis here is shown as '2'.

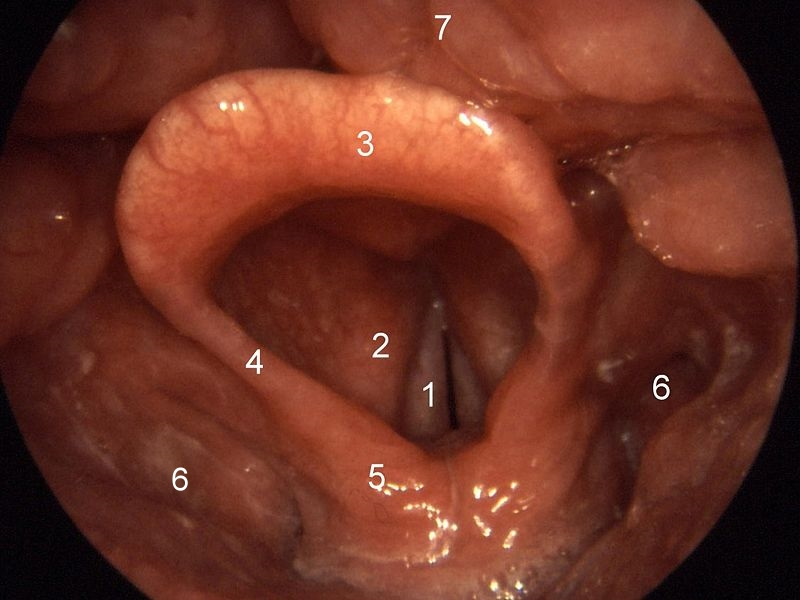
Structures of the larynx as viewed during laryngoscopy. The leaf-like epiglottis is shown as number '3'. Other structures: 1=vocal folds, 2=vestibular fold, 3=epiglottis, 4=plica aryepiglottica, 5=arytenoid cartilage, 6=sinus piriformis, 7=dorsum of the tongue.

== See also ==
- Epiglottal consonant
- Epiglotto-pharyngeal consonant
- Pharyngeal consonant
