= Heinrich Lamm =

Heinrich Lamm (January 19, 1908 – July 12, 1974), a Jewish German-American physician, was a pioneer in using optical fibers for image transmission, and was the first to make a fiber-optic endoscope.

When Lamm was a medical student in 1930, he developed the first flexible fiber-optic bundle capable of transmitting images around curves. His initial purpose was to check inaccessible parts inside the human body. He reported his experiments, but the imaging quality was poor. Lamm's effort to file a patent failed due to a British patent already filed by Clarence Hansell.

== Life ==
Heinrich Lamm was the first of two sons of Ignaz Lamm and his wife Martha (Pinczower). His brother was the journalist Hans Lamm.

Heinrich Lamm studied medicine in Breslau and Munich. Because of his Jewish origin, the Nazis' seizure of control in Germany undermined his hopes of an academic career. He succeeded in moving his family to the United States, where he practiced medicine in Kansas City, Missouri, and later La Feria, Texas.

Lamm was married to Annie Lamm, also an M.D., and they had two children: Michael, an automotive writer and book publisher, and Miriam, who owned and operated a personnel agency.
