= Ortner's syndrome =

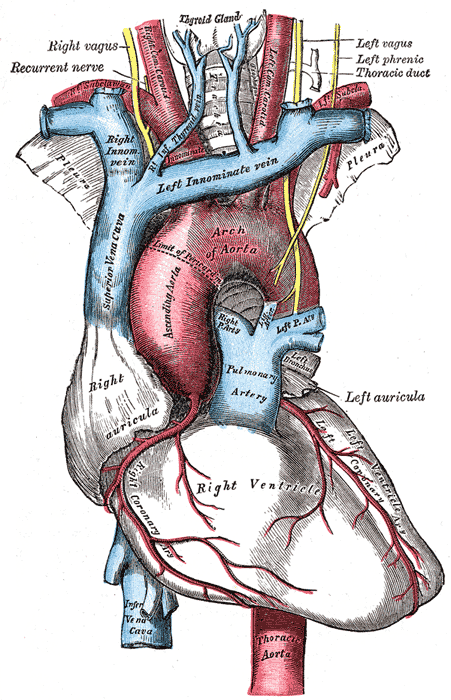
- Image of aortic anatomy showing proximity of vagus nerve and its recurrent branch to the aorta
- Specialty: Neurology

Ortner's syndrome is a rare cardiovocal syndrome and involves recurrent laryngeal nerve palsy from cardiovascular disease. It was first described by Norbert Ortner (1865–1935), an Austrian physician, in 1897.

Dysphagia caused by a similar mechanism is referred to as dysphagia aortica (also called dysphagia megalatriensis), or, in the case of subclavian artery aberrancy, as dysphagia lusoria. Due to compression of the recurrent laryngeal nerve, it can cause the hoarseness of the voice, which can also be a sign of mitral stenosis. A second Ortner's syndrome, Ortner's syndrome II, refers to abdominal angina.

== Causes ==
Due to its low frequency of occurrence, more common causes of hoarseness should be considered when suspecting left recurrent laryngeal nerve palsy (LRLN).

When considering cardiovocal syndrome, the most common historical cause is a dilated left atrium due to mitral stenosis, but other causes, including pulmonary hypertension, thoracic aortic aneurysms, an enlarged pulmonary artery and aberrant subclavian artery syndrome have been reported compressing the nerve.

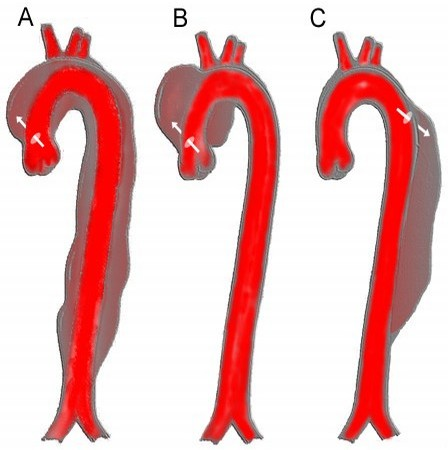
Figure 2: This image shows the three different types of aortic dissection.

Figure 3: A visualization of the aorta (4) in relation to the pulmonary artery (5).

Some examples of reported cardiovascular causes include:

- Congenital abnormalities:
  - Atrial septal defect
  - Aortopulmonary window
  - Ebstein's Anomaly
  - Patent Ductus Arteriosus (PDA)
- Surgical intervention:
  - Transcatheter closure of a PDA
    - Incidence: due to the close proximity of the LRLN to the aortic arch, transient paralysis can occur in 10% of cases while permanent effects can occur in 1% of cases. This can further be attributed to using metal clips (used to control bleeding) during the surgical procedure and is more common in premature infants.
- Cardiac disease:
  - Left atrial enlargement due to valvular heart disease
    - Notable case: A middle-aged male had ongoing cough, hoarseness of voice, and shortness of breath for two years without a history of smoking was found to have mitral valve stenosis due to calcification. This led to left atrial enlargement, elevated pulmonary artery pressure, pulmonary artery hypertension, and right ventricular enlargement. This cardiomegaly, or enlargement of the heart, led to compression of the LRLN.
  - Atrial Myxoma
  - Aorta:
    - Traumatic injury
      - Incidence: Although injury to the thoracic aorta is often fatal, in 10% of cases that take longer to present, hoarseness may be the first symptom.
    - Aortic dissection
      - More commonly affects the right recurrent laryngeal nerve as the most common type of aortic dissection is type A (Figure 2).
    - Pseudoaneurysm
      - Notable case: A male with long-standing uncontrolled hypertension and hoarseness of voice attributed to life-long smoking was found to have a pseudoaneurysm of the aortic arch which was compressing the LRLN.
- Pulmonary disease:
  - Pathophysiology: Due to vascular congestion in the lung, the pulmonary artery (Figure 3) becomes dilated and can compress the aorta and the LRLN.
    - Primary pulmonary hypertension
    - Pulmonary emboli
- Malignancy (pulmonary, mediastinal)
- Autoimmune:
  - Mixed connective tissue disease
    - Notable case: A young female with a history of mixed connective tissue disease presented with hoarseness of voice and was found to have secondary pulmonary artery hypertension. This was causing right heart enlargement and therefore compression of the LRLN.
- Idiopathic

== Diagnosis ==
It is important to consider a potential cardiovascular cause of hoarseness particularly in patients with progressive disease. Once suspected, performing a laryngoscopy is the first step in identifying damage to the left recurrent laryngeal nerve. Examination includes:

- Swallowing evaluation to assess for risk of aspiration (food going down the trachea instead of the esophagus).
- Breathing testing to rule out incomplete vocal cord closure.
- Voice quality.

== History ==
This correlation between hoarseness of voice and cardiac anatomic pathology was first described by Dr. Norbert Ortner in 1897 after he observed left recurrent laryngeal nerve palsy (LRLN) in three patients with left atrial enlargement secondary to mitral valve stenosis. The definition of Ortner's syndrome has since then expanded to encompass all possible causes of left recurrent laryngeal nerve palsy with cardiac etiologies.
