= Vocal cord paresis =

Injury to one or both recurrent laryngeal nerves

Vocal fold paresis
- Other names: Recurrent laryngeal nerve paralysis, vocal fold paralysis
- Specialty: Otorhinolaryngology
- Complications: Mutism

Vocal cord paresis, also known as recurrent laryngeal nerve paralysis or vocal fold paralysis, is an injury to one or both recurrent laryngeal nerves (RLNs), which control all intrinsic muscles of the larynx except for the cricothyroid muscle. The RLN is important for speaking, breathing and swallowing.

The primary larynx-related functions of the mainly efferent nerve fiber RLN include the transmission of nerve signals to the muscles responsible for regulation of the vocal folds' position and tension to enable vocalization as well as the transmission of sensory nerve signals from the mucous membrane of the larynx to the brain.

A unilateral injury of the nerve typically results in hoarseness caused by a reduced mobility of one of the vocal folds. It may also cause minor shortages of breath as well as aspiration problems especially concerning liquids. A bilateral injury causes the vocal folds to impair the air flow resulting in breathing problems, stridor and snoring sounds, and fast physical exhaustion. This strongly depends on the median or paramedian position of the paralyzed vocal folds. Hoarseness rarely occurs in bilaterally paralyzed vocal folds.

== Signs and symptoms ==
Symptoms from RLN damage	Symptoms from SLN damage
Rough voice quality; Breathy voice quality; Vocal fold bowing; Decreased vocal fold mobility; Glottal insufficiency; Hyperfunction; Vocal fatigue or mutism; Reduced vocal stamina; Changes in voice pitch or pitch range; Difficulty varying pitch at a quick rate; Difficulty projecting voice or speaking loudly or in noisy environments; Throat pain; Bouts of choking; Diplophonia	Swallowing difficulties; Chronic coughing; Globus sensation; Hypersensitivity or abnormal sensation; Vocal fold spasms; Pain from vocal use; Loss of voice in high pitch ranges

Typically, patients with vocal fold paresis or paralysis are able to identify the onset of their symptoms. The most commonly reported symptom patients with either vocal fold paresis or paralysis make is having a rough voice quality. The symptoms of vocal fold paresis are not specific to the condition and tend to be common symptoms of other voice disorders as well. Vocal fold bowing, decreased vocal fold mobility, especially decreased mobility of the arytenoid cartilage, are often observed in vocal fold paresis. Glottal insufficiency is another common symptom observed in vocal fold paresis. In this case, the vocal folds do not come together properly. Glottal insufficiency may be hard to identify, especially when the area above the vocal folds is hyperfunctional. Hyperfunction may also make it difficult to detect the presence of vocal fold paresis. Hyperfunction of the area above the vocal folds may be considered a sign of glottal insufficiency and potentially, vocal fold paresis.

In some cases, glottal closure may appear to be normal, however, asymmetries in the vocal folds may still be present. Though voice qualities may appear normal in some cases of vocal fold paresis or paralysis, mild differences in tension between the two vocal folds of the larynx can result in changes of voice pitch, intensity and reduced vocal stamina.

Patients with either vocal fold paresis or paralysis may exhibit a breathy voice quality. This voice quality results from the increased activity of the vocal folds to compensate for the immobility of the PCA muscle(s). Patients may need to use more effort than normal when speaking and may find that their voice quiets or grows tired after speaking for a long time. This is known as vocal fatigue. Patients may also complain about having a limited pitch range and trouble varying their pitch at quick rate. It is often difficult for the speaker to project their voice and speak loud enough to be heard in noisy environments, over background noise, or when speaking to someone from a distance. It is possible for symptoms to surface only in situations where the environmental acoustics are poor, such as outdoors. Patients may report feeling pain in the throat or experiencing bouts of choking. A patient presenting with diplophonia is of major concern as this typically means that the mass and tension of their vocal folds are asymmetrical which may also indicate vocal fold paresis.

Swallowing difficulties (dysphagia) are not commonly seen in vocal fold paresis that results from RLN damage. Dysphagia may however, suggest SLN damage. Symptoms of sensory nerve damage include: chronic coughing, the feeling of having a lump in the throat (globus sensation), hypersensitivity or abnormal sensation, spasms of the vocal folds (laryngospasms), dysphagia, pain from vocal use, and voice loss in high pitch ranges. It is possible for both the RLN and the SLN to be damaged simultaneously, so the symptoms of RLN and SLN damage may be seen independently or alongside one another.

If maladaptive compensatory strategies are used more and more to try to offset the voice difficulties, the vocal mechanisms will fatigue and the above symptoms will worsen.

== Causes ==
There are a wide variety of possible causes of vocal fold (VF) paresis, including congenital (i.e. present at birth) causes, infectious causes, tumors, traumatic causes, endocrinologic diseases (i.e. thyroid disease), and systemic neurologic diseases.

=== Congenital ===
Congenital conditions that are implicated in VFP include neurological disorders like hydrocephalus and Arnold-Chiari malformation, dysmorphic neurological disorders such as Moebius syndrome or Goldenhar Syndrome, anatomical abnormalities such as a tracheoesophageal fistula, vascular anomalies (e.g. vascular ring) affecting the vocal mechanism, syndromes affecting brainstem function or atrophic diseases such as Charcot-Marie-Tooth.

In the absence of imaging, either invasive (e.g. laryngoscopy) or non-invasive (e.g. computed tomography scan), congenital VFP can be detected in infants through the presence of stridor (i.e. a high-pitched wheezing resulting from a blockage in the larynx or trachea), difficulties feeding, an abnormal sounding cry or excessive hoarseness.

Recovery from congenital VFP varies and is reliant on the severity of the condition. Some cases of VFP recover spontaneously, often within the first year. If the paresis is persistent, surgical options such as vocal fold injections or tracheotomy can be taken into consideration.

=== Infection ===
Many viral infections have been reported as a cause for VF paresis, including herpes simplex virus, Epstein-Barr virus, Varicella-Zoster, cytomegalovirus, HIV, West Nile virus, and upper respiratory infection. Bacterial infections have also been reported to cause VF paresis, such as syphilis and Lyme disease.

=== Tumors ===
When abnormal cells group together in the body, they are said to form a tumor. Tumors can be either malignant (cancerous) or benign (non-cancerous). Tumors may lead to paralysis of the vocal folds when they affect the recurrent laryngeal nerves (RLNs) either directly or indirectly:

- RLN paralysis can be caused by tumors of the thyroid, lung, esophagus, and mediastinum.
- Radiation as a treatment for malignant head and neck tumors can reduce the number of blood vessels in the treatment area and lead to scarring. In some cases, this can paralyze the vagus nerve, of which the RLNs are branches.
- Tumors of the vagus nerve, called vagal neurilemmomas, can also paralyze the vocal folds.

=== Trauma ===
VF paresis can result from trauma to one of more laryngeal nerves during intubation, surgery (e.g. thyroidectomy, parathyroidectomy, spine surgery, carotid endarterectomy, vagal nerve stimulator implantation), injection of botulinum neurotoxin, or penetrating neck trauma.

=== Thyroid disease ===
Causes of VF paresis also include diseases of the thyroid gland, such as hypothyroidism, goiter, and thyroiditis.

=== Systemic neurologic diseases ===
Several neurological diseases can cause VF paresis including:

- Myasthenia Gravis (MG), a rare neuromuscular autoimmune disease. MG's dominant characteristic is muscles weakness including facial, jaw, pharyngeal and laryngeal muscles.
- Charcot-Marie-Tooth (CMT), a neurological heredity disease that affects both motor and sensory functions. CMT affects the nerve cells and interrupts the transmission of nerve impulses as it concerns the axons and the myelination of the nerve cells.
- Multiple Sclerosis (MS), which is an autoimmune disease that damages the myelin sheet surrounding the axons of the cranial nerves and the spinal nerves. There are several types of MS depending on the course of the disease.
- Spinocerebellar Degeneration, a term that refers to a rare yet diverse chronic disease that affects the brain and the spinal cord. Spinocerebellar Degeneration is usually an inherited progressive disease; however, toxicity and vitamin deficiency can result in the acquired type of cerebellar degeneration disease.

Additionally, there are pieces of evidence that some Systemic Rheumatological Diseases such as sarcoidosis, rheumatoid, scleroderma can result in having VF paresis.

=== Cardiovascular ===
A rare cause of vocal cord paresis that often presents itself as unexplained hoarseness is cardiovocal syndrome or Ortner's syndrome. Although it was originally identified in patients with left atrial enlargement, the definition has expanded to include aneurysms of the aortic arch, pulmonary hypertension due to mixed connective tissue disease, or aberrant subclavian artery syndrome among other causes of left recurrent laryngeal nerve palsy with cardiovascular origin.

== Diagnosis ==
There are a variety of ways to diagnose vocal fold paralysis. Important indications of possible causes can be revealed in the patient's medical history, which may inform which diagnostic approach is taken. Voice diagnostics are used to assess voice quality and vocal performance. Voice assessment is necessary to plan and estimate the success of a possible speech therapy.^{[12]}

An auditory-perceptual evaluation is conducted by a Speech-Language Pathologist (S-LP), and allows changes in voice quality to be monitored over time. There are two scales which can be used to subjectively measure voice quality: the GRBAS (grade, roughness, breathiness, asthenia, strain) and the CAPE-V (Consensus Auditory Perceptual Evaluation of Voice). The GRBAS is used to rate the patient's voice quality on 5 dimensions: grade (overall severity), roughness, breathiness, asthenia (weakness) and strain. Each dimension will receive a severity rating from 0 (not present) to 3 (severe). This allows the S-LP to make a judgment about the overall severity of the voice quality. The CAPE-V is used in a similar manner, rating of the dimensions of voice quality on a subjective scale from 0–100, and using this to determine an overall severity score.

In the presence of neural lesions with unknown cause, a thorough ENT endoscopy with additional imaging techniques (computed tomography (CT) of the chest, particularly in the case of left-sided paralyses, and magnetic resonance imaging (MRI) of the neck including the base of the skull and the brain, ultrasound examination of the neck) are performed to exclude tumors along the laryngeal nerves. When tumor formation is suspected, parts of the hypopharynx and the upper esophagus and passive mobility of the arytenoid cartilage are endoscopically examined under anesthesia.

Voice diagnostics are used to assess voice quality and vocal performance. Voice assessment is necessary to plan and estimate the success of a possible speech therapy. In incompletely or only partially healed paralyses, stroboscopic larynx examinations yield a type of slow motion picture to assess tension and fine mobility of the vocal folds during vocalization. Stroboscopy and voice assessment are important to establish an individual treatment plan to improve the voice.

Breathing tests (spirometry, body plethysmography) are used to measure impairment of respiratory flow through the larynx, particularly in patients with bilateral paralysis.

Electromyography of the larynx muscles (larynx EMG), which measures the electrical activity of the larynx muscles via thin needle electrodes, allows better differentiation between a neural lesion and other causes of impaired mobility of the vocal fold and localization of the lesion along the nerve. The larynx EMG can, within limits, provide a prognosis of the development of a recurrent laryngeal nerve paralysis. Patients with a poor chance of healing can be identified at an early stage. Unfortunately, this advanced examination technique is not available in all treatment centers.

The treating physician must view all examination results combined and establish an individual diagnosis and treatment plan for each patient.

=== Classification ===
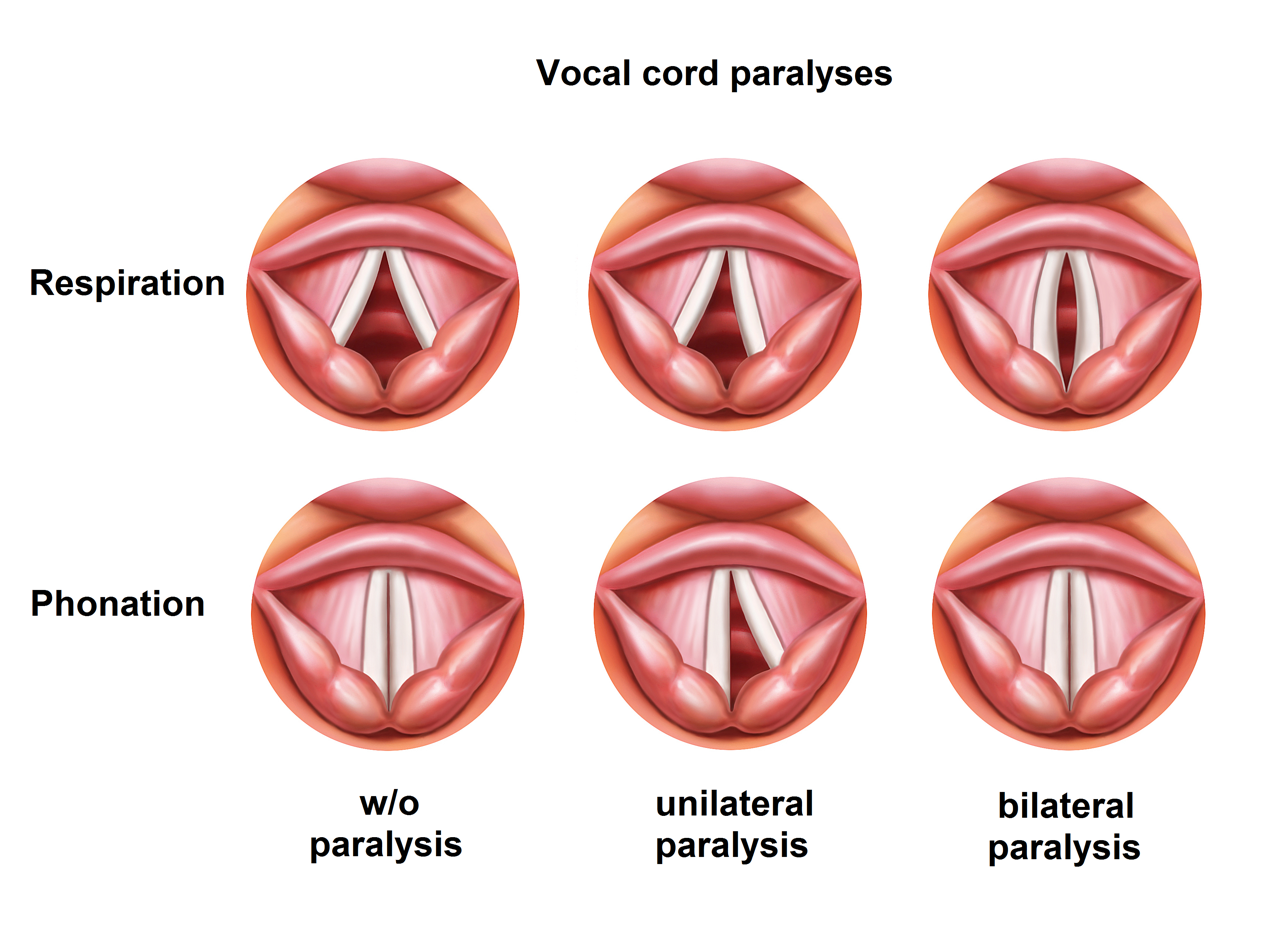
vocal cord positions regarding paralyses

Vocal fold paresis refers to a partial loss of input to the nerve of the vocal folds. This loss of neural input leads to reduced vocal fold mobility. It is a condition with a variable profile, as the severity of the paresis can range on a wide continuum from minor to major loss of vocal fold mobility. Vocal fold paralysis, distinguished from vocal paresis, is the total loss of vocal fold mobility due to a lack of neural input to the vocal folds. These conditions result from continuous damage to the laryngeal nerves and often lead to vocal disability. Recurrent laryngeal nerve damage is the most common cause of vocal fold paresis. The RLN is responsible for motor input to the vocal folds. Physicians may also use the term recurrent laryngeal nerve paralysis. Additionally, superior laryngeal nerve damage (SLN) can also lead to vocal fold paresis. The SLN is responsible for sensory input to the vocal folds. Due to its variable nature, the progression of vocal fold paresis may fluctuate, so it may be characterized differently from one evaluation to the next. Fluctuating vocal fold paresis has been observed in neurodegenerative disorders like Guillain–Barré syndrome or myasthenia gravis.

The posterior cricoarytenoid (PCA) is a muscle of the larynx that is responsible for pulling the vocal folds apart from one another. Vocal fold paresis describes the weakness of the PCA and an impairment to its functioning. Unilateral vocal fold paresis is the term used when there is damage to the RLN on one side of the body. In unilateral vocal fold paresis, there is a lack of nerve supply to one side of the vocal fold's PCA muscle. This lack of nerve supply renders the arytenoid cartilage immobile. The RLN may be damaged during surgical procedures. The right RLN in particular, has a greater chance of being damaged during surgery due to its position in the neck. When both of the vocal folds' PCA muscles lack a nerve supply, the term bilateral vocal fold paresis is used. With bilateral vocal fold paresis, a person's airway may become blocked as the muscles are unable to pull the vocal folds apart fully.

== Treatment ==
The treatment of vocal fold paralysis varies depending on its cause and main symptoms. For example, if laryngeal nerve paralysis is caused by a tumor, suitable therapy should be initiated. In the absence of any additional pathology, the first step of clinical management should be observation to determine whether spontaneous nerve recovery will occur. Voice therapy with a speech-language pathologist is suitable at this time, to help manage compensatory vocal behaviours which may manifest in response to the paralysis.

=== Voice therapy ===
The overall goal of voice therapy is to narrow the glottis without causing hyperfunction of the surrounding muscles. In the past, forced adduction exercises were used to push the vocal folds together, but often resulted in additional stress on the vocal folds. Current methods focus more generally on improving abdominal support, muscle strength and agility.

==== Hard glottal attacks ====
Hard glottal attacks involve building up subglottal pressure (air pressure below the vocal folds) before letting out a vowel sound. Often, this method is beneficial for clients who compensate by use of a falsetto register.

==== Half-swallow boom ====
The half-swallow boom allows for a repositioning of the vocal folds by taking advantage of laryngeal positioning when swallowing. The client is asked to take a breath and then initiate the movement of swallowing, followed by forcefully saying "boom". When performed properly, the "boom" sounds loud and clear. Eventually, this sound can be generalized to other words and phrases.

==== Abdominal breathing ====
Training in breath support is essential for those clients who identify as professional voice users. Shifting the awareness of the breath to the belly (diaphragmatic breathing) aids in efficient vocal function, reducing the risk of hyperfunction and muscular tension.

==== Lip and tongue trills ====
Lip and tongue trills aid in the balance of resonance, as well as coordinate the muscles of respiration, phonation and articulation. In addition, subglottal pressure may increase during lip trills, and result in the generation greater vocal fold vibration.

=== Surgery ===
After 9 months of observation, should the paralysis not resolve and the patient be dissatisfied with the outcomes of voice therapy, the next option is temporary injection medialization. In this procedure, a variety of materials can be injected into the body of the vocal fold in order to bring it closer to the midline of the glottis. Materials such as Teflon, autologous fat, collagens acellular dermis, fascia, hydroxyapatite and hyaluronates are available to be used in the procedure. The choice of substance is dependent on several factors, taking into consideration the specific condition and preference of the patient as well as the clinical practice of the surgeon. The materials serve the purpose of filling up the vocal folds and increasing their volume. This allows the paralyzed vocal fold to make contact with the alternate fold, in order to more efficiently produce phonation. While injection augmentation has been long considered best practice, neither technique nor materials used have been standardized across clinicians. With this, results prove to be both safe and effective, but variable in their duration, lasting anywhere from 2 to 12 months.

For patients with significant paralysis at 12 months post-onset, medialization thyroplasty may be suggested. This surgical procedure introduces a shim between the inner wall of the larynx and the soft tissue supporting the vocal fold. As a result, the paralyzed vocal fold is supported in a position closer to the midline of the glottis, and retains its ability to vibrate and phonate efficiently.

In addition to medialization thyroplasty, arytenoid adduction can be performed to improve phonation results. This medical procedure consists of pulling the vocal processes of the arytenoid medially while monitoring the voicing quality being produced by the patient. When the best phonation appears to be achieved, the vocal processes are then maintained in place by a thread.

A further surgical intervention used to mitigate vocal fold paresis is laryngeal reinnervation. This procedure restores nerve supply to the larynx and can be accomplished according to different techniques. Depending on the specific condition (i.e. bilateral versus unilateral vocal fold paralysis), these techniques include reconnecting parts of the RLN, supplying the laryngeal muscles with a donor nerve like the ansa cervicalis, or connecting the RLN to a donor nerve.For bilateral vocal fold paralysis, endoscopic laser cordectomy is an alternative to tracheotomy.

==== Post-surgical outcomes ====
In many cases, the surgical treatment options described above (temporary injection medialization, medialization thyroplasty, arytenoid adduction, and laryngeal reinnervation) have led to favourable outcomes as measured perceptually, acoustically, by laryngoscope, or via quality of life measures. However, none of these surgical interventions has been shown to be significantly better than the others.

==== Voice therapy after surgery ====
It is generally recommended that voice therapy start 1 to 2 months after surgery, when swelling has subsided. Post-surgical intervention is warranted to restore laryngeal muscle strength, agility and coordination.

== Epidemiology ==
Due to the complex and controversial nature of this condition, epidemiological (incidence) reports vary significantly and more research in this area is needed. Instead of reporting the incidence of this condition within the general population, most studies are conducted within specialized voice disorder clinics. In such a setting, one study found that approximately 26% of patients are diagnosed with paralysis or paresis of the vocal folds. Yet, incidence rates as high as 80% for vocal fold paresis have been reported elsewhere. Yet another source reported only 71 cases of vocal fold paresis over 7 years. Incidence rates of vocal fold paresis after undergoing thyroid surgery have been reported between 0.3% and 13.2%, whereas these incidence rates are between 2% and 21.6% after undergoing spinal surgery.

== See also ==
- Puberphonia
