= Left atrial volume =

Heart measurement used as a biomarker

The volume of the heart's left atrium (left atrial volume) is an important biomarker for cardiovascular physiology and clinical cardiology. It is usually calculated as left atrial volume index in terms of body surface area.

== Measurement ==
The left atrial volume is commonly measured by echocardiography or magnetic resonance tomography. It is calculated from biplane recordings with the equation:

$${A}_{L}=\frac{8}{3\pi }\frac{A4c \cdot  A2c}{L}$$

where A4c and A2c denote LA areas in 4- and 2-chamber views respectively, and L corresponds to the shortest long-axis length measured in either views.

Usually, the volume of the left atrium is divided by the body surface area in order to provide an extensive property, which is independent from body size. The resulting index is referred to as left atrial volume index (LAVI):

$$LAVI=\frac{{A}_{L}}{BSA}$$

== Physiology ==
LAVI between 16 and 34 ml/m2 is regarded as normal. 2015 ASE guidelines.

== Pathophysiologiy and clinical implications ==
Enlargement of the left atrium is a form of cardiomegaly. Moderately increased LAVI (63 to 73 mL/m^{2}) is associated with slightly elevated mortality hazard and severely increased LAVI (>73 mL/m^{2}) with significantly higher hazard ratio of mortality.

LAVI predicts survival after acute myocardial infarction, postoperative atrial fibrillation in subjects undergoing heart surgery, atrial fibrillation and stroke as well as hospital admission in ambulatory patients.
