= Arytenoid adduction =

Arytenoid adduction is a surgical procedure used to treat vocal cord paralysis. A suture is used to emulate the action of the lateral cricoarytenoid muscle and position the paralyzed vocal cord closer to the midline. This allows the two vocal cords to meet and can improve speaking and swallowing ability for affected patients. Arytenoid adduction is often performed in conjunction with medialization thyroplasty.

== Vocal Cord Paralysis ==
One of the key functions of the larynx is phonation, the production of sound. Phonation requires the vocal cords to be adducted (positioned towards the midline) so that they can meet and vibrate together as air is expelled between them. Physiologically, the glottis is closed by intrinsic laryngeal muscles such as the lateral cricoarytenoid, thyroarytenoid, and interarytenoid muscles. These muscles act on the arytenoid cartilages at the posterior ends of the vocal cords and are innervated by the left and right recurrent laryngeal nerves. Damage to these nerves results in vocal cord paralysis - the reduced mobility and inability to adduct one or both vocal cords. Many cases of vocal cord paralysis result from trauma during surgery. Symptoms include hoarseness of voice, difficulty projecting, difficulty swallowing, and throat pain.

The arytenoid adduction procedure alleviates these symptoms by manually positioning the paralyzed vocal cord towards the midline. This is accomplished by passing a suture between the muscular process of the arytenoid cartilage and the thyroid cartilage. This rotates the arytenoid cartilage and adducts the vocal cord.

== Procedure ==
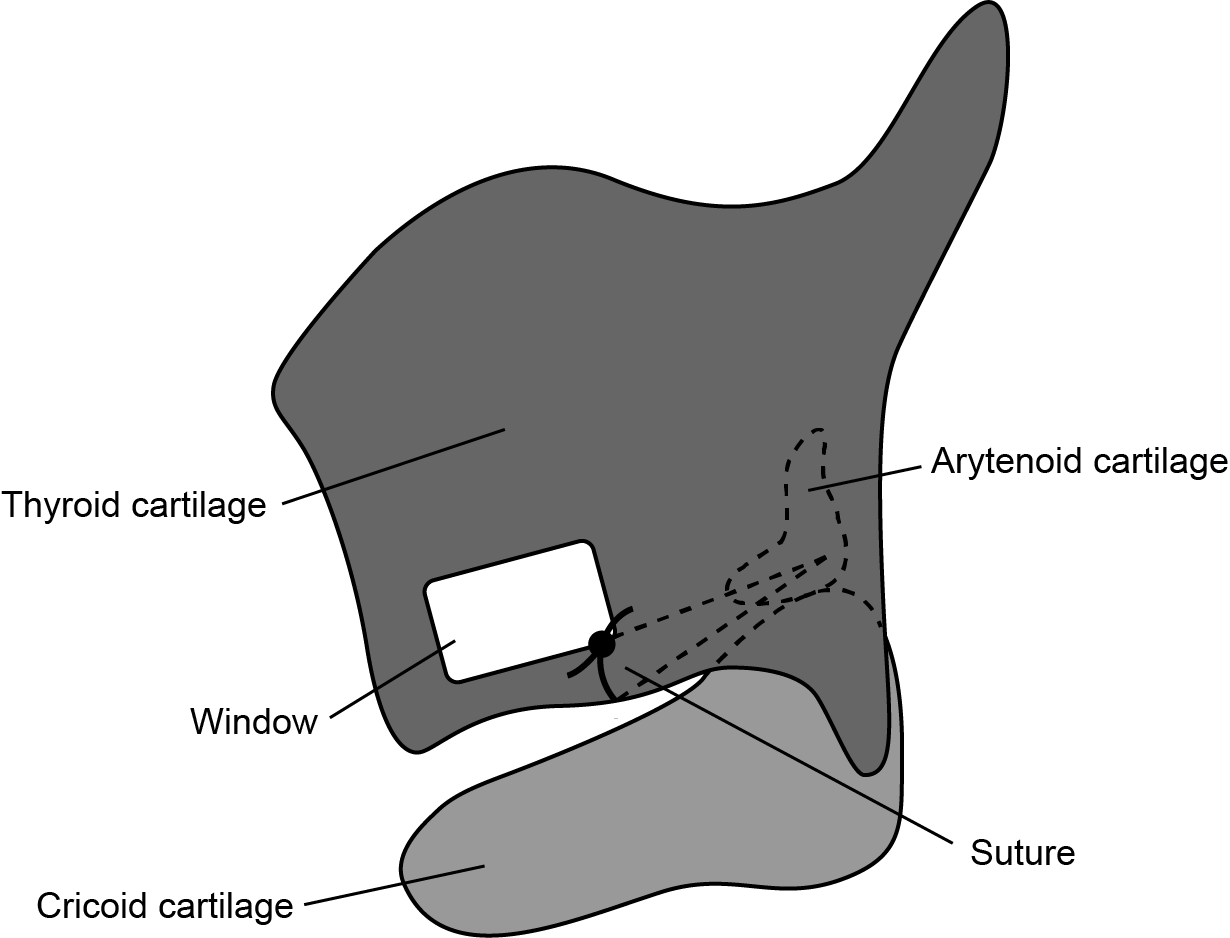
Diagram of arytenoid adduction procedure, lateral view.

- Local anesthesia is preferred for arytenoid adduction so that the voice can be tested during the procedure.
- A horizontal skin incision is made at the inferior border of the thyroid cartilage.
- A window is cut in the thyroid cartilage for a suture to be passed through later in the procedure.
- The strap muscles, pharynx, and larynx are dissected to expose the muscular process of the arytenoid cartilage.
- A permanent suture is passed through the muscular process.
- A tunnel is made in the thyroid cartilage and one end of the suture is passed through it.
- The suture is tied and secured to the window made in the thyroid cartilage.
- The vocal cords are observed endoscopically to ensure proper rotation of the arytenoid.
- The patient is asked to phonate to evaluate voice quality and the potential need for a concurrent thyroplasty.

== Indications ==
Options for surgical treatment of vocal cord paralysis include vocal cord injection, medialization thyroplasty, and arytenoid adduction. Each of these techniques results in medialization of the paralyzed vocal cord. However, arytenoid adduction is preferred in cases where there is a large posterior glottal gap or vertical misalignment between the vocal folds. Arytenoid adduction is often performed at the same time as a medialization thyroplasty. Animal model studies suggest that combining the two procedures produces better outcomes than when performing either alone.

=== Posterior glottal gap ===
The paralyzed vocal cord may rest close to or far from the midline. An extremely laterally positioned vocal cord can result in a large posterior glottal gap - an opening between the two vocal cords even when the functioning vocal cord is fully medialized. Vocal cord injection is ineffective for closing a large glottal gap. Arytenoid adduction is more effective than medialization thyroplasty for closing a posterior gap. It has been suggested that this is because arytenoid adduction directly rotates the arytenoid cartilage and thus more actively medializes the posterior aspect of the vocal cord.

=== Vertical glottal gap ===
The paralyzed vocal cord may rest on a different plane than the opposite vocal cord. This results in a vertical gap between the two vocal cords that cannot be resolved using vocal cord injection or medialization thryoplasty. The suture placed in the arytenoid adduction procedure mimics the action of the lateral cricoarytenoid muscle and pulls the vocal process of the arytenoid cartilage medially and inferiorly. Thus arytenoid adduction can correct the vertical position of an elevated vocal cord.

== Outcomes ==
Arytenoid adduction with or without medialization thyroplasty significantly improves quality of life for patients with vocal cord paralysis. Subjective outcome measures of voice quality include the Grade, Roughness, Breathiness, Asthenia, Strain (GBRAS) voice scale, Voice Handicap Index, and closure of the glottic gap. Objective outcome measures include mean and maximum phonation time, phonatory airflow, and signal-to-noise ratio. Arytenoid adduction produces improvements in all of these parameters.

== Disadvantages and complications ==
Arytenoid adduction is more technically challenging than either vocal cord injection or medialization thyroplasty and has a high learning curve. Increased incidence of complications have been reported for arytenoid adduction compared to medialization thyroplasty.

Potential complications include:

- Wound infection
- Edema
- Hematoma
- Vocal cord spasms

Intubation and/or tracheotomy may be required as a result of these complications.
