= Endoscopic laser cordectomy =

Endoscopic laser cordectomy, also known as Kashima operation, is an endoscopic laser surgical procedure performed for treating the respiratory difficulty caused as a result of bilateral abductor vocal cord paralysis. Bilateral vocal fold paralysis is basically a result of abnormal nerve input to the laryngeal muscles, resulting in weak or total loss of movement of the laryngeal muscles. Most commonly associated nerve is the vagus nerve (10th cranial nerve) or in some cases its distal branch, the recurrent laryngeal nerve. Paralysis of the vocal fold may also result from mechanical breakdown of the cricoarytenoid joint. It was first described in by Kashima in 1989.

== Medical uses ==
Bilateral abductor paralysis of the vocal folds being the main indication, Kashima operation is also done to treat vocal cord malignancies and dysplastic lesions of vocal cords. This surgical management is usually undertaken with a target of decannulation in tracheotomy-dependent patients.

=== Advantages ===
The procedure being short and easy to perform makes it the treatment of choice for management of the same. Due to minimal invasiveness during the procedure, the time of anesthesia is reduced and good functional results such as swallowing and good voice quality can be obtained. The main objective of the procedure being enlarging the airway, it has become an alternative to tracheotomy, as here the airway is enlarged by making a wedge shaped resection in the posterior vocal cord and retracting the tissue after freeing the vocal ligament and the vocal muscle from the vocal processes.

== Contraindications ==
Kashima Operation should be avoided in cases when a tumour is diffused throughout the thyroid cartilage, because operating in such cases may damage the tumour which may lead to its metastasis. The procedure should be avoided in patients with history of bradycardia, aneurysms or recent infarcts where general anesthesia may become a threat to patient's life. In patients with fractured cervical spine it is not possible to perform this laser surgery because proper positioning of the patient would not be possible. Similarly in cases of severe ankylosing spondylitis, due to complete fusion and rigidity of the spine, movements are not possible which again hampers the proper positioning of the patient.

== Complications ==
Circulatory and respiratory disorders may arise due to general anesthesia. Injury to teeth, laceration of palate, hematoma and laceration of tongue or lips may occur during introduction of the laryngoscopes. During the cordotomy, larynx might get injured and bleeding can occur. As a normal body response to any injury, Granuloma and scar formation may take place. Post operative edema might occur as the surrounding structures are also slightly affected during the procedure.

== Procedure ==
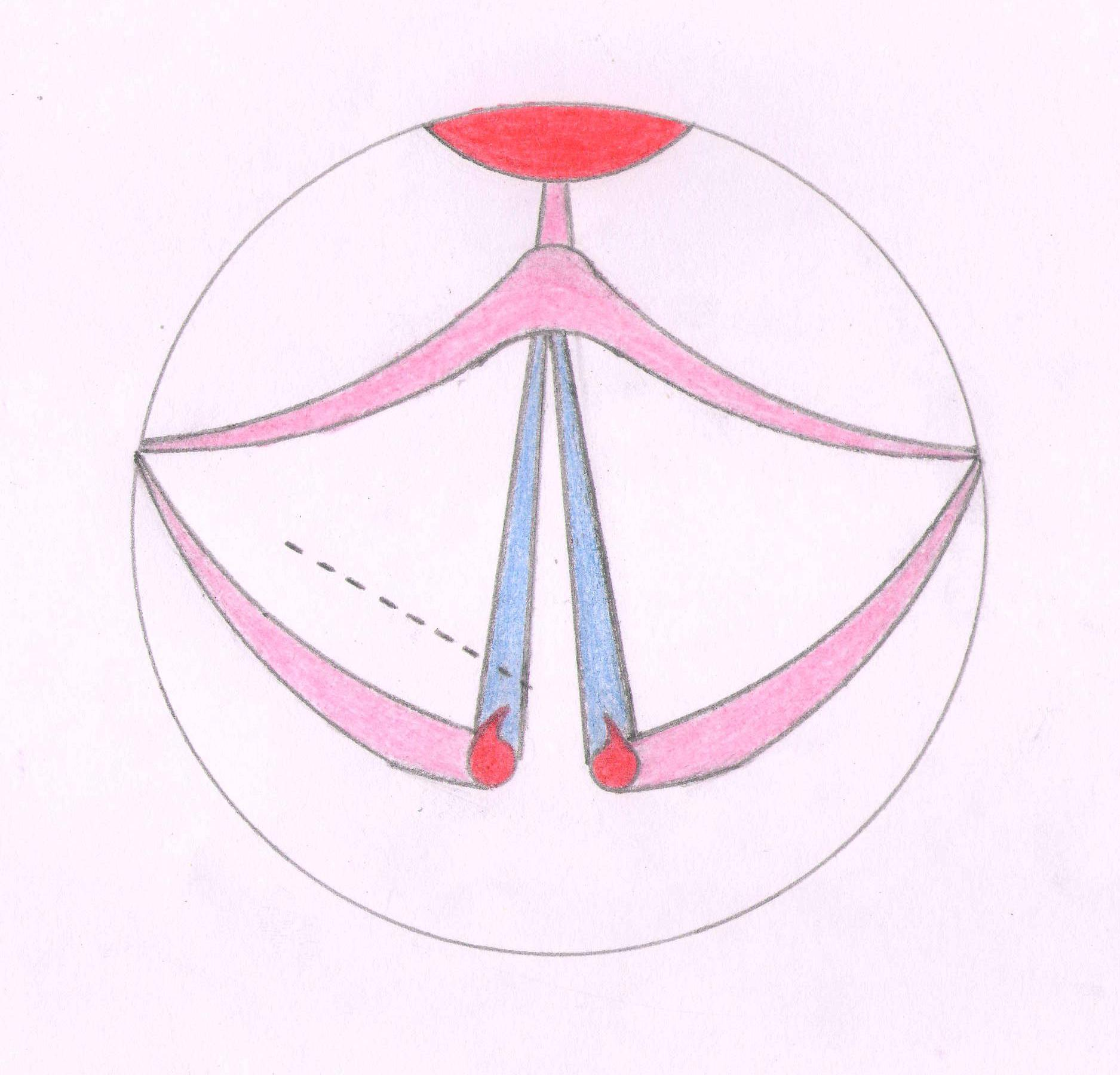
The image is showing cordotomy incision(grey dotted line) on the posterior part of the right vocal cord.

Surgery is performed under the effect of general anesthesia. The correct position of the patient is mandatory for the ideal introduction of laryngoscope. Preferably the patient should lie flat on the operating table without any head ring or sand bag beneath the shoulders. Before introduction of the laryngoscope, dental plate should be put in place. After tracheotomy, with a laser-safe endotracheal tube the patient is intubated with an ample exposition of the glottis. A small laser-protected endotracheal tube is placed in case there is no pre-existing tracheotomy. A modification to this technique is made by using endoscopic CO_{2} laser posterior cordotomy without tracheotomy to not compromise respiration by minimising the postoperative edema. This modified procedure involves a judicious excision of 3.5–4 mm C-shaped wedge in posterior vocal cord from the open edge of the membranous cord using carbon dioxide laser. Excision is made anteriorly to the vocal process, continuing 4 mm laterally on to the ventricular band without exposing the cartilage. A 6–7 mm transverse opening is created at the posterior larynx by the surgical resection. To avoid unwanted effects of general anesthesia and prevent any infection during the operation, antibiotics, steroids, and H2 blockers are administered intraoperatively.

=== Technique ===
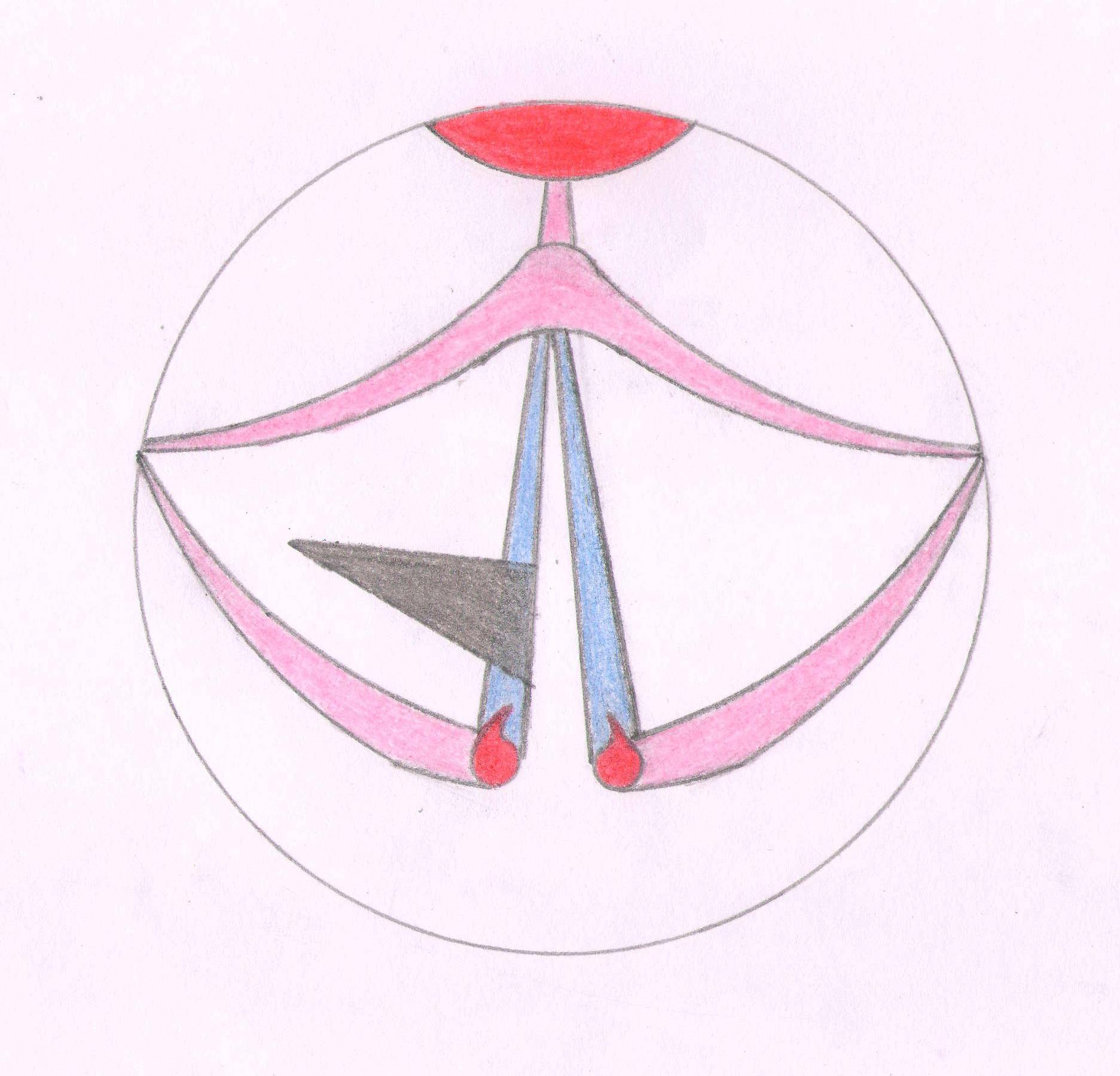
The image is showing the result of cordotomy incision on the posterior part of right vocal cord.

The procedure begins with orotracheal intubation using a laser-safe endotracheal tube. The eyes of the patient are padded and taped followed by draping of the head and application of upper tooth guard. When the patient is anesthetized sufficiently and full relaxation is seen. The largest feasible laryngoscope is introduced, to obtain a good view of the larynx. After positioning of the laryngoscope, it is fixed in place with the help of the chest holder. The light carrier is withdrawn after the adjustment of scope in desired position and then the operating microscope is introduced. The head and face of the patient is protected with moist towels. Then the operating microscope fitted with 400 mm lens and a microspot CO_{2} laser is brought in position. The endotracheal tube cuff is protected by a moist cottonoid sponge placed in subglottis. The site for the cordotomy is determined at the preoperative examination. If any one of the vocal fold seems to have a slightest degree of motion, then cordotomy is performed on the other one. Using CO_{2} laser with a spot size of 0.2 mm and power of 3-5 Watts, a cordotomy is performed 1-2mm anteriorly to the vocal process. This is then carried laterally to the thyroid lamina through the width of the vocal ligament and vocalis muscle. The cordotomy provides access to the arytenoid cartilage as well as opens the airway posteriorly.

=== Postoperative Care ===
After the operation, the patient is slightly immunocompromised, so to avoid infection by opportunistic organisms, oral antibiotic therapy is given for 1 week. Anti -gastroesophageal reflux treatment is given for 8 weeks to avoid the gag reflex occurring due to post operative edema. The patient should be advised to take absolute voice rest by avoiding coughing, singing and clearing of the throat. Coughing can be treated with cough suppressing and mucolytic agents. Inhalation of steam is advised twice daily. Follow-up endoscopy with flexible endoscopes is performed 3 days after the procedure, to clean up the fibrous residues. Once the mucosal healing is complete, the patients with tracheotomy can be decannulated within 6 weeks of the procedure.
