= Atrial enlargement =

- Specialty: Cardiology
- Types: Left atrial enlargement; Right atrial enlargement
- Diagnostic method: electrocardiogram

Atrial enlargement refers to a condition where the left atrium or right atrium of the heart is larger than would be expected. It can also affect both atria.

Types include:

- Left atrial enlargement
- Right atrial enlargement
