= Right atrial enlargement =

- Other names: Right atrium enlargement
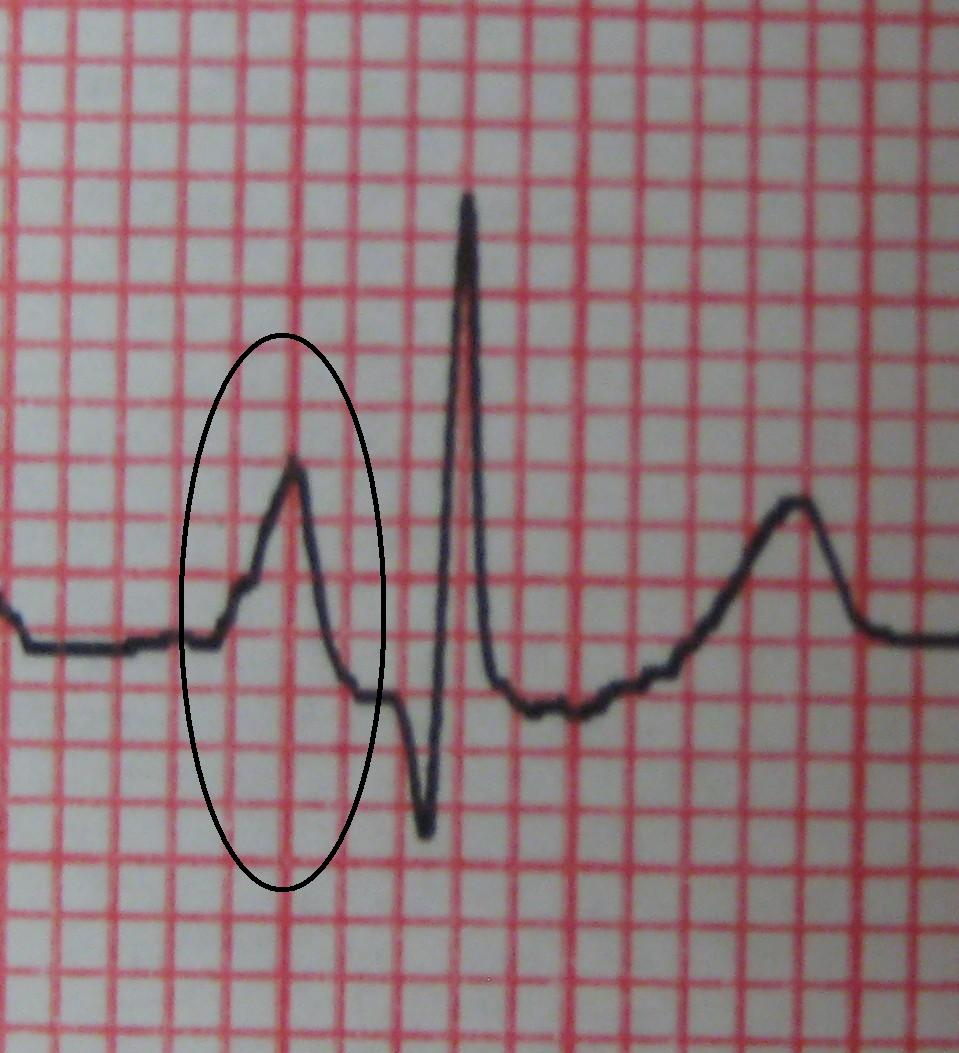
- Right atrial enlargement (P pulmonale)
- Causes: Pulmonary Hypertension
- Diagnostic method: electrocardiogram

Right atrial enlargement (RAE) is a form of cardiomegaly, or heart enlargement. It can broadly be classified as either right atrial hypertrophy (RAH), overgrowth, or dilation, like an expanding balloon. Right atrial enlargement (RAE) is clinically significant due to its prevalence in diagnosing supraventricular arrhythmias.

== Signs and symptoms ==
Symptoms of right atrial enlargement include palpitations, dyspnea, paroxysmal tachycardia, general malaise, shortness of breath, syncope, chest pain, fatigue, cyanosis, loss of appetite, tachycardia, fever, and cough. Many patients with right atrial enlargement are asymptomatic.

== Causes ==
Common causes include pulmonary hypertension, which can be the primary defect leading to RAE, or pulmonary hypertension secondary to tricuspid stenosis; pulmonary stenosis or Tetralogy of Fallot i.e. congenital diseases; chronic lung disease, such as cor pulmonale. Other recognised causes are: right ventricular failure, tricuspid regurgitation, and atrial septal defect.

Most authors have classified this condition as congenital, but the etiology is still unknown.

== Diagnosis ==
Right Atrial Enlargement (RAE) increases the p wave, representing atrial depolarization, on an ECG to an amplitude > 2.5mm in lead II, an abnormality referred to as p-pulmonale, likely due to weakened right atrial myocardium close to the Sinoatrial (SA) node.

ECG criteria for RAE: P wave amplitude in lead II > 2.5 mm and upward deflection of the P wave in lead V1 > 1.5 mm in amplitude.

Large "a" waves on the JVP waveform can also aid in diagnosis.

Early diagnosis using risk factors like RAE may decrease mortality because patients with RAE are at 9x more risk of arrhythmias and other cardiac conditions compared to their healthy counterparts.

== Treatment ==
Treatment for RAE can include taking certain medications such as diuretics, beta-blockers, anticoagulants, and anti-arrhythmics. If medications are not effective enough, procedures such as implanting a pacemaker, cardioverter-defibrillator (ICD), or a left ventricular assist device (LVAD), heart valve surgery, and coronary bypass surgery may be needed. The last resort treatment option would be a complete heart transplant.

== Prevention ==
Prevention for RAE comes from maintaining a healthy lifestyle with plenty of exercise and eating plenty of vegetables, fruits, and whole grains and avoiding or limiting alcohol and caffeine. It is also important to control heart disease risk factors including diabetes, high cholesterol, and high blood pressure. Exercise, pregnancy, and prior health conditions like ASD II can also promote cardiac remodeling, so routine primary care visits are important to distinguish between physiological and pathological atrial enlargement.

Regular primary care visits and routine testing has also been shown to protect against the development of cardiovascular disease and may play a key role in early identification and treatment.

== See also ==
- Cardiomegaly
- Left atrial enlargement
