= Cardiomegaly =

Enlargement of the heart

- Other names: Megacardia, megalocardia, enlarged heart
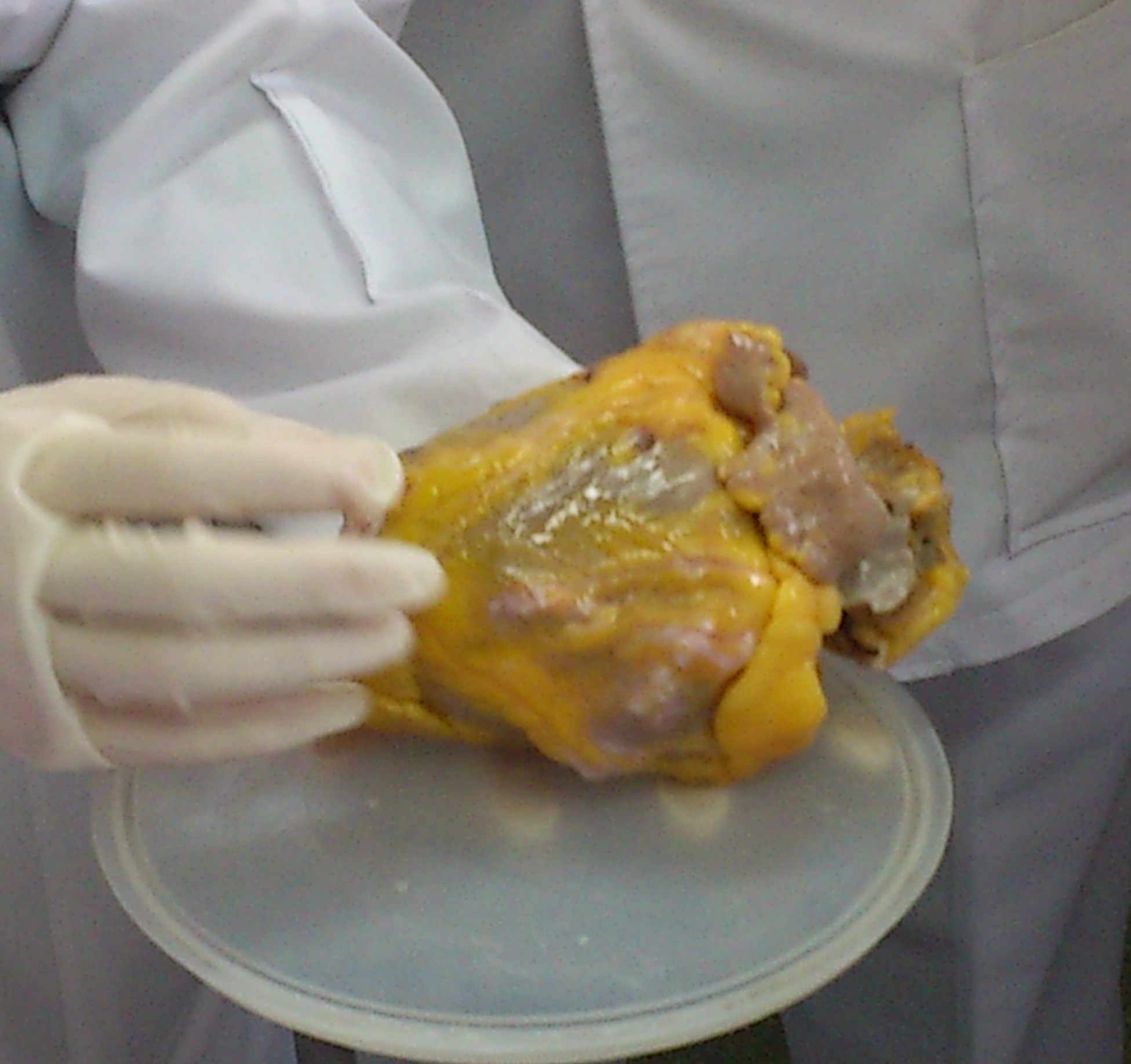
- Calcified heart taken out of an older woman with cardiomegaly
- Specialty: Cardiology
- Types: Athletic heart syndrome, Ventricular hypertrophy, Atrial enlargement
- Causes: Dilated cardiomyopathy, Hypertrophic cardiomyopathy.
- Diagnostic method: Hypertrophic cardiomyopathy screening

Cardiomegaly (sometimes megacardia or megalocardia) is a medical condition in which the heart becomes enlarged. It is more commonly referred to simply as "having an enlarged heart". It is usually the result of underlying conditions that make the heart work harder, such as obesity, heart valve disease, high blood pressure (hypertension), and coronary artery disease. Cardiomyopathy is also associated with cardiomegaly.

Cardiomegaly can be serious and can result in congestive heart failure. Recent studies suggest that cardiomegaly is associated with a higher risk of sudden cardiac death.

Cardiomegaly may diminish over time, but many people with an enlarged heart (dilated cardiomyopathy) need lifelong medication. Having a family history of cardiomegaly may indicate an increased risk for this condition.

Lifestyle factors that can help prevent cardiomegaly include eating a healthy diet, controlling blood pressure, exercise, medications, and not abusing anabolic-androgenic steroids, alcohol and cocaine.

== Signs and symptoms ==
For many people, cardiomegaly is asymptomatic. For others, if the enlarged heart begins to affect the body's ability to pump blood, then symptoms associated with congestive heart failure may arise, including:

- Heart palpitations – the irregular beating of the heart, usually associated with a valve
- Severe shortness of breath (especially when physically active)
- Chest pain
- Coughing, when lying down
- Fatigue
- Leg swelling
- Increased abdominal girth
- Weight gain
- Edema – swelling
- Fainting

== Causes ==
The causes of cardiomegaly are not well understood and many cases have no known cause. Lifestyle-related risk factors include tobacco use and high cholesterol, high blood pressure, and some types of diabetes. Non-lifestyle risk factors include a family history of cardiomegaly, coronary artery disease (CAD), congenital heart failure, atherosclerotic disease, valvular heart disease, exposure to cardiac toxins, sleep-disordered breathing (such as sleep apnea), and sustained cardiac arrhythmias.

Research and the evidence of previous cases link the following (below) as possible causes of cardiomegaly.

The most common causes of cardiomegaly are congenital (patients are born with the condition based on a genetic inheritance), high blood pressure (which can enlarge the left ventricle causing the heart muscle to weaken over time), and coronary artery disease. In the latter case, the disease creates blockages in the heart's blood supply, leading to tissue death which causes other areas of the heart to work harder, causing the heart to expand in size.

Other possible causes include:

- Heart valve disease
- Cardiomyopathy (disease of the heart muscle)
- Pulmonary hypertension
- Pericardial effusion (fluid around the heart)
- Thyroid Disorders
- Hemochromatosis (excessive iron in the blood)
- Amyloidosis
- Chagas disease, an important cause of cardiomegaly in Latin America
- Viral infection of the heart
- Pregnancy, with enlarged heart developing around the time of delivery (peripartum cardiomyopathy)
- Kidney disease requiring dialysis
- Alcohol or cocaine abuse
- HIV infection
- Diabetes

Cardiomegaly can also occur non-pathologically as part of athletic heart syndrome (AHS) in individuals who frequently engage in high-intensity physical exercise, for instance endurance athletes and other individuals who exercise for more than 1 hour daily. AHS is a result of physiological cardiac remodeling, which is a natural adaptation to frequent physical exercise and a high level of physical fitness. Cardiomegaly due to AHS is usually benign and reversible, but it is important that athletes with suspected AHS undergo screening to rule out potentially life-threatening underlying heart problems.

In recent years, after the deaths of several rock and metal drummers from drug overdoses, autopsies have revealed that they were suffering from cardiomegaly, which may have been worsened by a mix of drug use and the cardiovascular effects of the exertion involved in rock drumming. Examples of such cases include Jimmy 'The Rev' Sullivan (Avenged Sevenfold) and Taylor Hawkins (Foo Fighters).

== Mechanism ==
Within the heart, the working fibers of the myocardial tissue increase in size. As the heart works harder the actin and myosin filaments experience less overlap which increases the size of the myocardial fibers. If there is less overlap of the protein filaments within the sarcomeres of the muscle fibers, they will not be able to effectively pull on one another. If the heart tissue gets too big and stretches too far, then those filaments cannot effectively pull on one another to shorten the muscle fibers, impacting the heart's sliding filament mechanism. If fibers cannot shorten properly and the heart cannot contract properly, then blood cannot be effectively pumped to the lungs to be re-oxygenated or to the body to deliver oxygen to the working tissues of the body.

An enlarged heart is more susceptible to forming blood clots in the heart lining. These clots can form elsewhere in the body, potentially disrupting blood supply to other organs.

== Diagnosis ==
Many techniques and tests are used to diagnose an enlarged heart. These tests can be used to see how efficiently the heart is pumping, determine which chambers of the heart are enlarged, look for evidence of prior heart attacks and determine if a person has congenital heart disease.

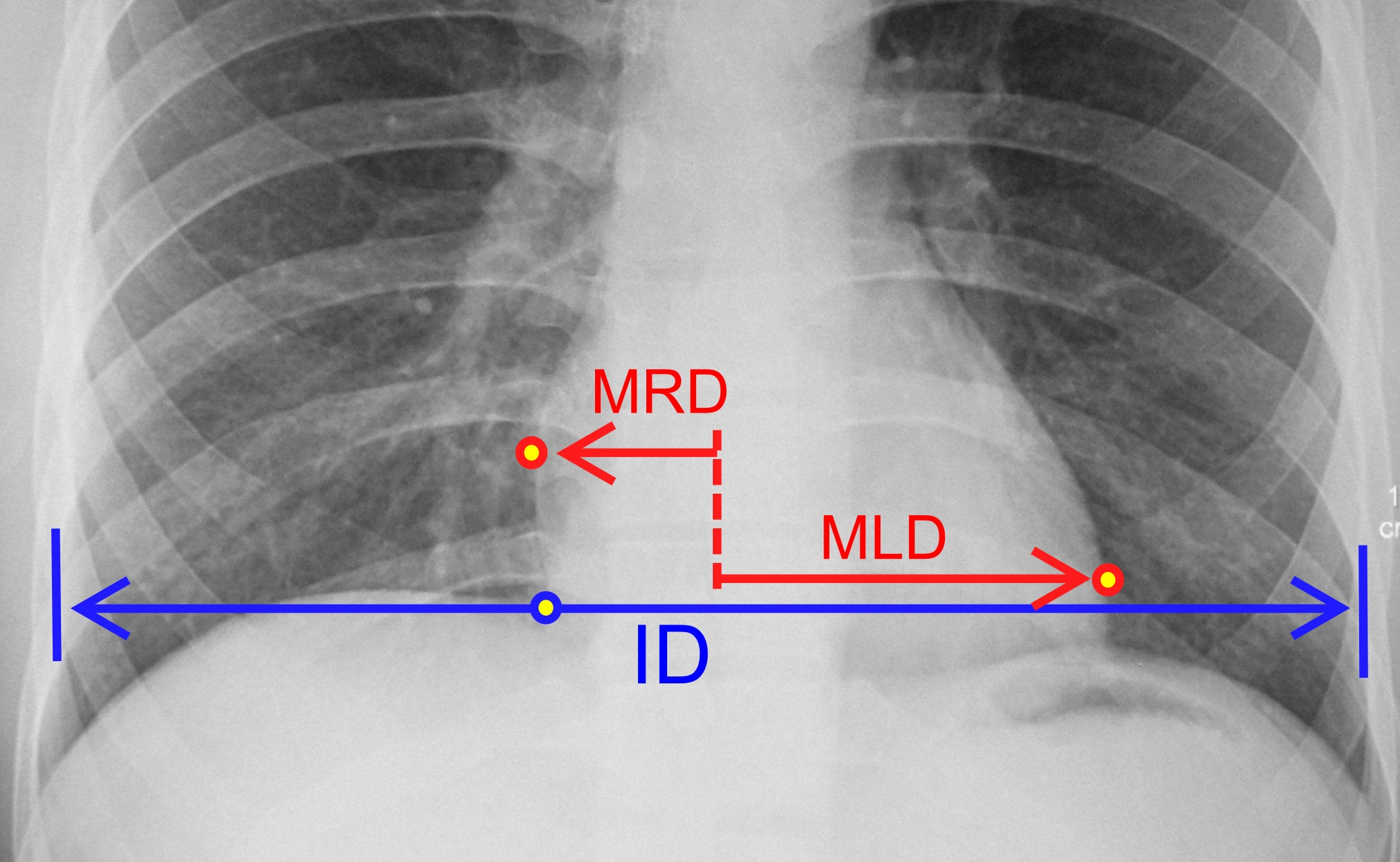
Cardiothoracic ratio = ${MRD + MLD \over ID}$ where: MRD = greatest perpendicular diameter from midline to right heart border MLD = greatest perpendicular diameter from midline to left heart border ID = internal diameter of chest at level of right hemidiaphragm

- Chest X-ray: X-ray images help to visualize the condition of the lungs and heart. If the heart is enlarged on an X-ray, other tests will usually be needed to find the cause. A useful measurement on X-ray is the cardio-thoracic ratio, which is the transverse diameter of the heart, compared with that of the thoracic cage. These diameters are taken from PA chest x-rays using the widest point of the chest and measuring as far as the lung pleura, rather than lateral skin margins. If the ratio is greater than 50%, pathology is suspected. The measurement was first proposed in 1919 to screen military recruits. A newer approach to using these x-rays for evaluating heart health takes the ratio of heart area to chest area and has been called the two-dimensional cardiothoracic ratio.

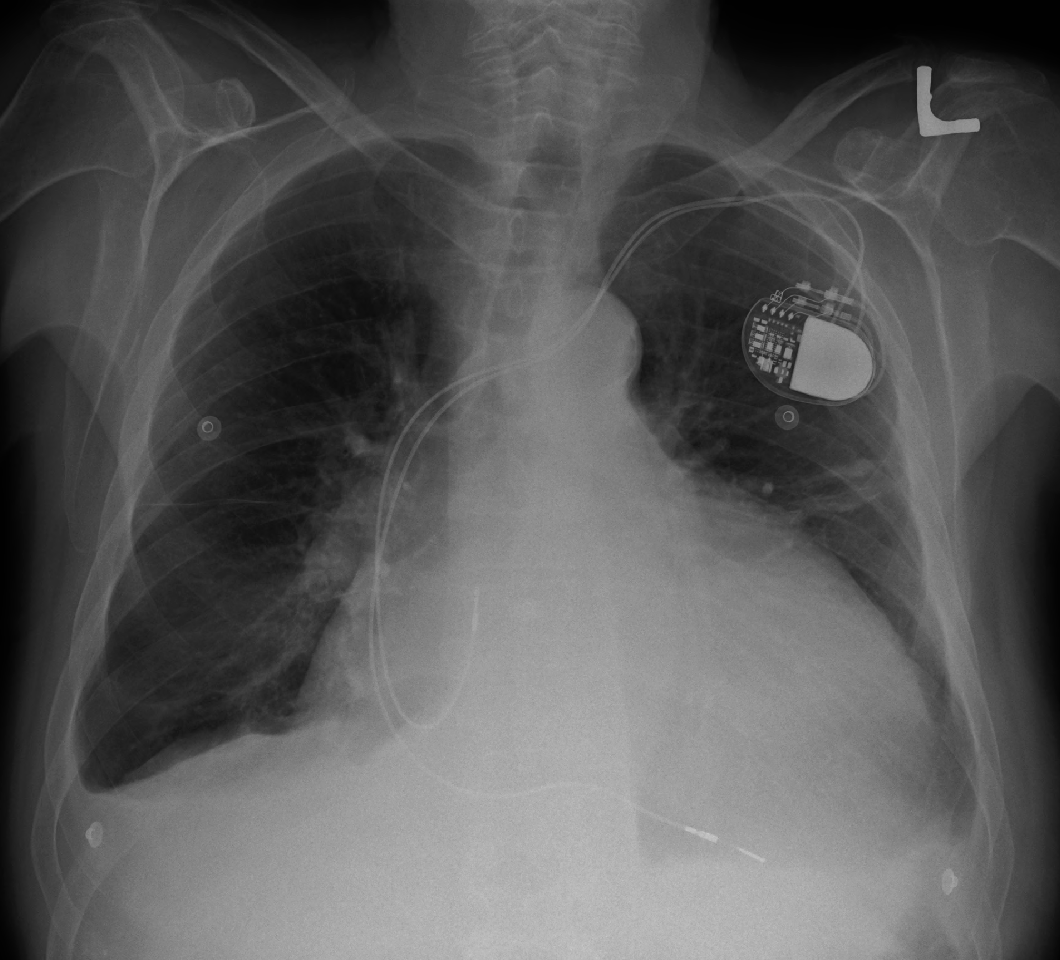
Cardiomegaly on chest X-ray with a pacemaker

- Electrocardiogram: This test records the electrical activity of the heart through electrodes attached to the skin. Impulses are recorded as waves and displayed on a monitor or printed on paper. This test helps diagnose heart rhythm problems and assess the damage to a person's heart from a heart attack.
- Echocardiogram: This test uses sound waves to produce a video image of the heart. With this test, the four chambers of the heart can be evaluated.
- Stress test: A stress test, also called an exercise stress test, provides information about how well the heart works during physical activity. It usually involves walking on a treadmill or riding a stationary bike while heart rhythm, blood pressure, and breathing are monitored.
- Cardiac computerized tomography (CT) or magnetic resonance imaging (MRI). These techniques create images of the heart for inspection.
- Blood tests: Blood tests may be ordered to check the levels of substances in the blood that may show a heart problem. Blood tests can also help rule out other conditions.

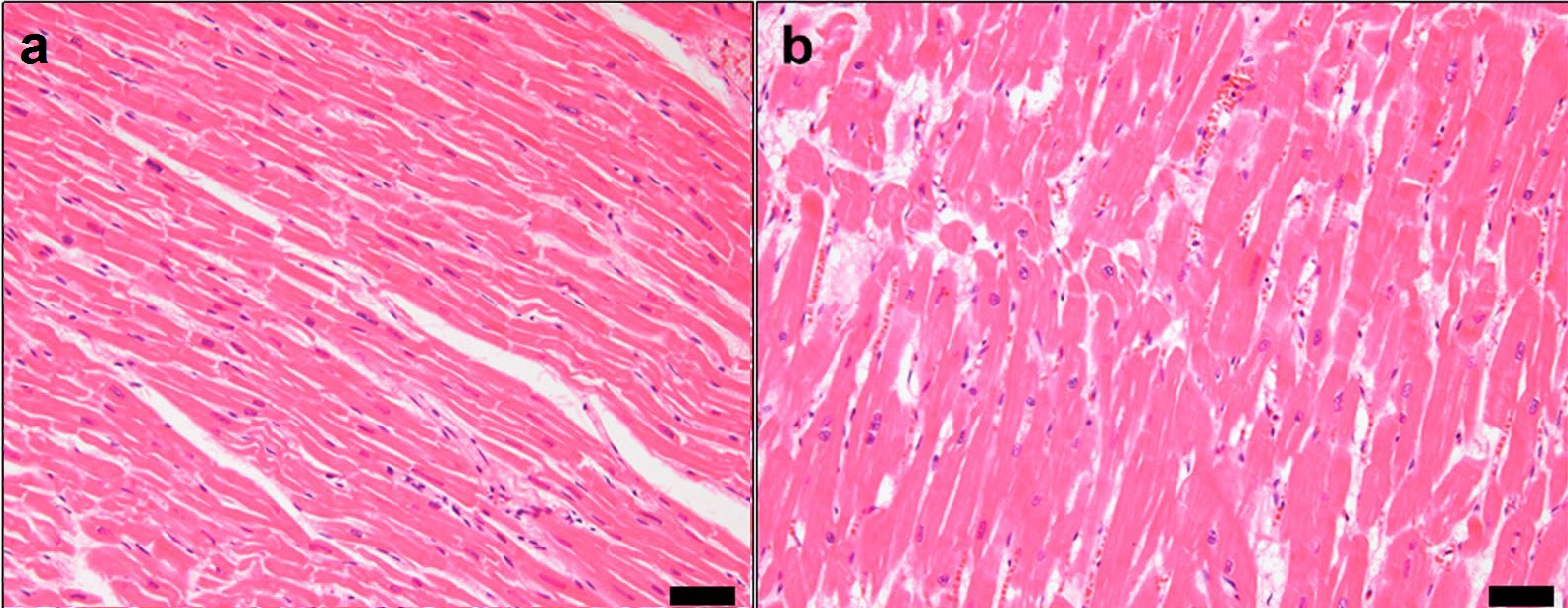
Histopathology of (a) normal myocardium and (b) myocardial hypertrophy. Scale bar indicates 50 μm.

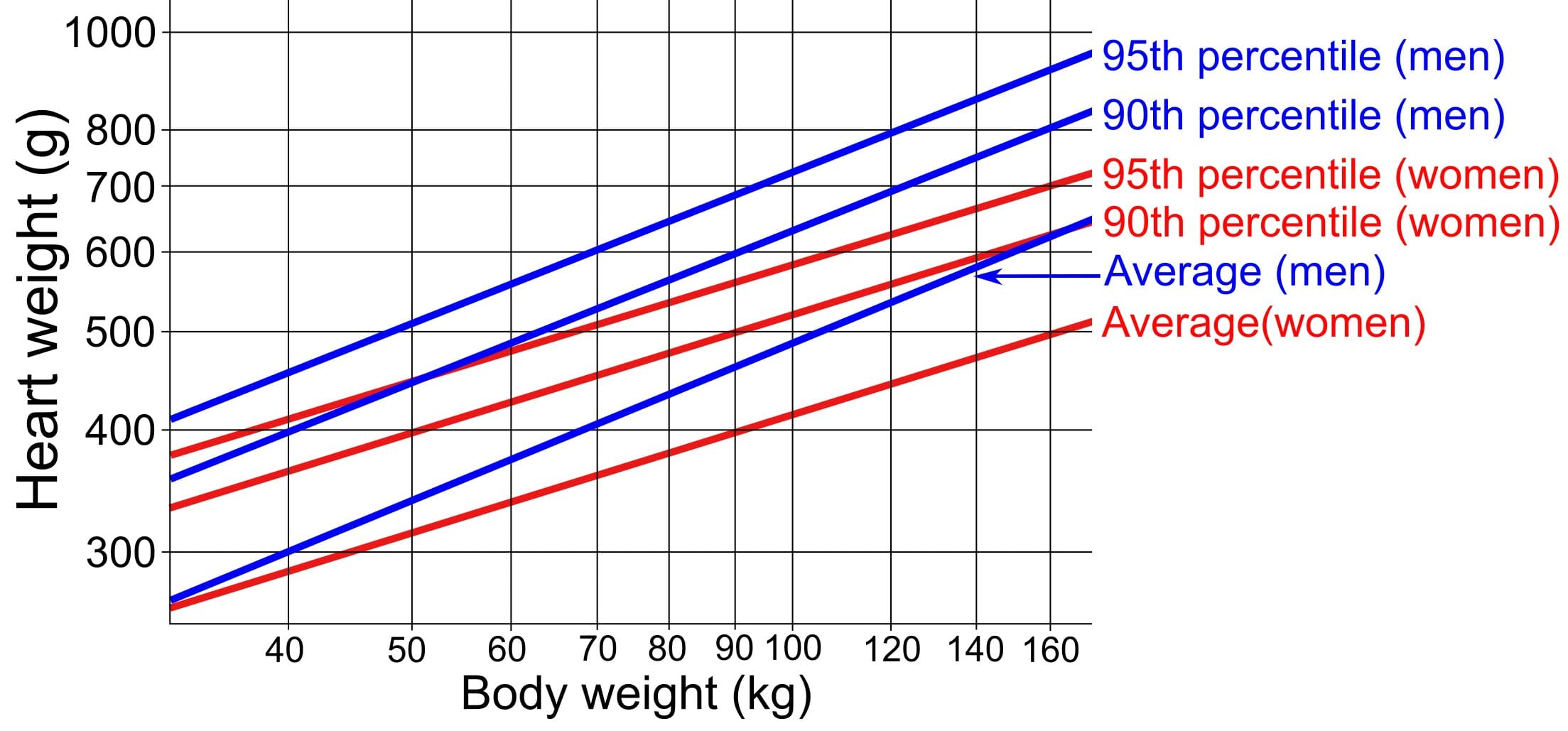
Weight of the heart versus the body

- Cardiac catheterization and biopsy: In this procedure, a catheter is inserted into the groin and threaded through the blood vessels to the heart, where a biopsy of the heart can be extracted for laboratory analysis.
- Autopsy: Cardiomegaly is indicated if the heart weighs more than >399 grams in women and >449 grams in men.

== Classification ==
Cardiomegaly can be classified by the main enlarged location of the heart, and/or by the structure of the enlargement.

Specific subtypes include athletic heart syndrome, which is a non-pathological condition commonly seen in sports medicine in which the heart is enlarged, and the resting heart rate is lower than normal.

=== By enlarged location ===
- Ventricular hypertrophy
  - Left
  - Right / Cor pulmonale
- Atrial enlargement
  - Left
  - Right

=== Structure of enlargement ===
Dilated cardiomyopathy is the most common type of cardiomegaly. In this condition, the walls of the left and/or right ventricles of the heart become thin and stretched.

In the other types, the heart's left ventricle becomes abnormally thick. Hypertrophy is usually what causes left ventricular enlargement. Hypertrophic cardiomyopathy is typically an inherited condition.

== Treatment ==
Treatments include a combination of medications and medical/surgical procedures. Below are some of the treatment options:

=== Medications ===
- Diuretics: to lower the amount of sodium and water in the body, which can help lower the pressure in the arteries and heart.
- Angiotensin-converting enzyme (ACE) inhibitors: to lower blood pressure and improve pumping ability.
- Angiotensin receptor blockers (ARBs): to provide the benefits of ACE inhibitors for patients with ACE inhibitor issues.
- Beta blockers: to lower blood pressure and improve heart function.
- Digoxin: to help improve heart pumping function and lessen the need for hospitalization for heart failure.
- Anticoagulants: to reduce blood clot risk.
- Anti-arrhythmics: to maintain normal heart rhythm.

=== Devices to regulate heartbeat ===
- Pacemaker: Coordinates contractions between ventricles. In people at risk of arrhythmias, drug therapy or an implantable cardioverter-defibrillator (ICD).
- ICDs: Small devices implanted in the chest to monitor heart rhythm and deliver electrical shocks to control abnormal heartbeats. The devices can also work as pacemakers.

=== Surgical procedures ===
- Valve surgery: If an enlarged heart is caused by a problem with a heart valve, surgery can remove the valve and replace it with either an artificial valve or a tissue valve from a pig, cow or deceased human donor. If blood leaks backward through a valve (valve regurgitation), the leaky valve may be surgically repaired or replaced.
- Coronary bypass surgery: to address coronary artery disease, which can lead to an enlarged heart.
- Left ventricular assist device: (LVAD): to help a weak heart pump, potentially while waiting for a heart transplant or as a long-term treatment for heart failure.
- Heart transplant: to provide a final option after other treatments fail.
