= Norbert Ortner =

Austrian internist (1865–1935)

Norbert Ortner von Rodenstätt (10 August 1865 – 1 March 1935) was an Austrian internist, whose name is associated with two cardiovascular syndromes.

Ortner was born in Linz, and was a pupil and successor of Edmund von Neusser (1852–1912) at the Rudolfstiftung Hospital in Vienna. He later became a professor at the Universities of Innsbruck and Vienna.

In 1916 he assisted in embalming the body of Kaiser Franz Joseph I. A description of the procedure appears in the medical record, and is one of the exhibits of the Vienna Pathological-Anatomical Museum (Pathologisch-Anatomisches Bundesmuseum in Wien). It states:

Protokoll aufgenommen am 23. November 1916 über die Conservierung der Leiche seiner Majestät des Kaisers Franz Josef I. vom gefertigten in Gegenwart der zwei mitunterschrieben behandelnden Ärzte. Die beiden großen Halsschlagadern werden freigelegt, in dieselben werden Kanülen eingebunden und sodann mit Formalin in concentriertem Zustand in den Kopf einerseits, in den Rumpf anderseits eingespritzt in der Menge von 5 Liter. Schließlich werden die gesetzten Halswunden vernäht.

The entry is signed by Alexander Kolisko, the pathologist and court doctor, by Joseph Ritter von Kerzl, the Kaiser's personal physician, and by Ortner, as the director of the Second Medical University Clinic at the hospital in Vienna.

He had a large private practice, and trained many physicians from Austria and Germany.

In 1916, Ortner was elevated to the Austrian aristocracy with the title "von Rodenstätt", and was officially known as Norbert Ortner von Rodenstätt, but lost the right to that title when the Austro-Hungarian monarchy was abolished in 1919.

Ortner syndrome I, first described by Ortner in 1897, is a left-sided vocal cord paralysis caused by compression of the laryngeal nerve due to cardiovascular changes.

The Ortner syndrome II is more commonly known as abdominal angina.

He had bulbar paralysis for many years. Ortner died in Salzburg on 1 March 1935 and is buried at Friedhof Rodaun, in Vienna.
