= Hypertrophic cardiomyopathy screening =

Procedure for detecting a form of heart disease

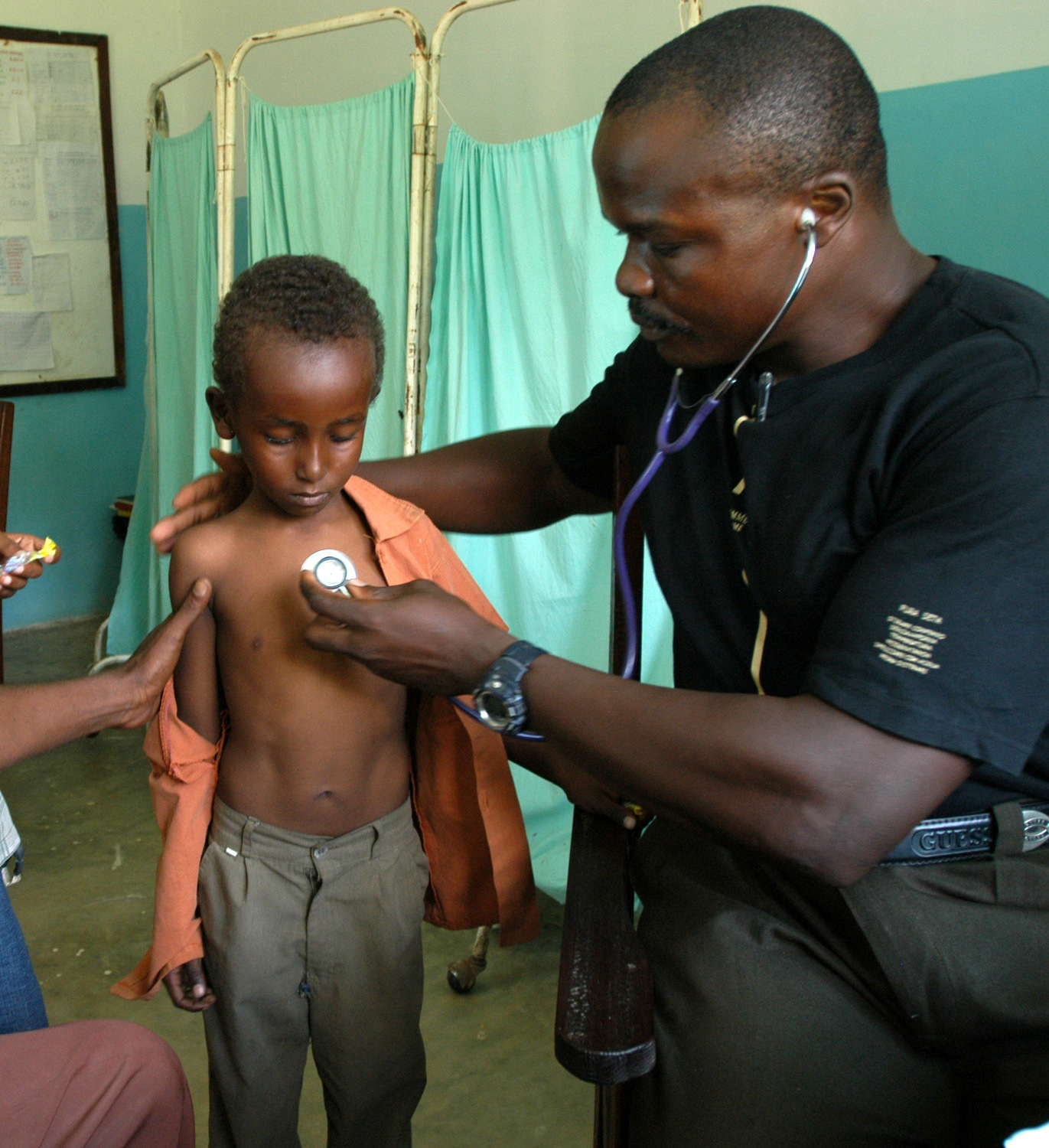
- Listening to the heart: part of screening
- Purpose: Detect and prevent sudden cardiac death, reduce complications of hypertrophic cardiomyopathy

Hypertrophic cardiomyopathy screening is an assessment and testing to detect hypertrophic cardiomyopathy (HCM).

It is a way of identifying HCM in immediate relatives of family members diagnosed with HCM, and athletes as part of a sports medical. It aims to detect HCM early, so that interventions can be commenced to prevent complications and sudden cardiac death.

== Purpose ==
HCM is a heart disease in which a portion of the heart becomes thickened without an obvious cause. It affects up to one in 200 people and runs in families. A significant number of people with the condition have no symptoms. Screening is a way of identifying HCM in immediate relatives of family members diagnosed with hypertrophic cardiomyopathy (HCM), and athletes as part of a sports medical. Additional tests may also be performed in those who faint or have exertional chest pain. It aims to detect HCM early, so that interventions can be commenced to prevent complications and sudden cardiac death. The purpose of screening is to increase the chances of an early diagnosis and thus a better prognosis. Early diagnosis facilitates surveillance for disease complications that may become fatal if left unmanaged. Screening and therefore diagnosing at an early age allows a patient to receive the appropriate therapies (medication for symptoms, ICD implantation, or myectomy) which in turn will improve the quality and length of life. Without appropriate therapies, the progression of familial HCM during childhood can lead to increased complications at an earlier stage of life.

== Screening ==
Generally, screening may be considered for anyone of any age with a family history of HCM or sudden death. It is really important to ask about family history in young athletes that are enduring physical activity. Screening includes at first a history of symptoms or family member with HCM, and a physical examination which may reveal a heart murmur or fourth heart sound. Initial tests include an ECG and 24-hour ambulatory ECG. Other tests include echocardiogram, genetic testing and cardiac MRI.

The American Heart Association have developed a 14-point evaluation for competitive athletes, which it recommends for screening healthy teenagers and young adults.

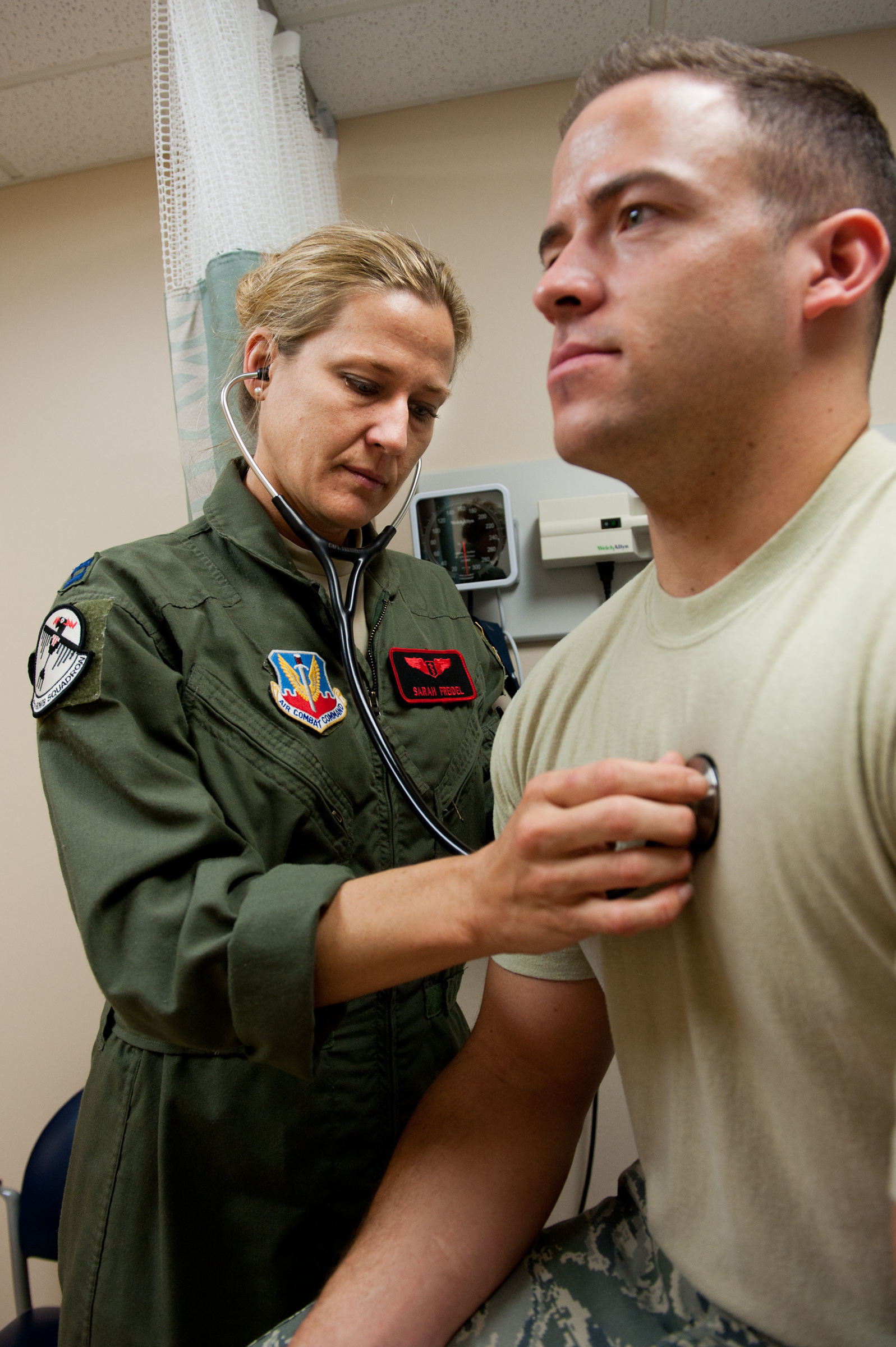
Flight medical: listening of the chest

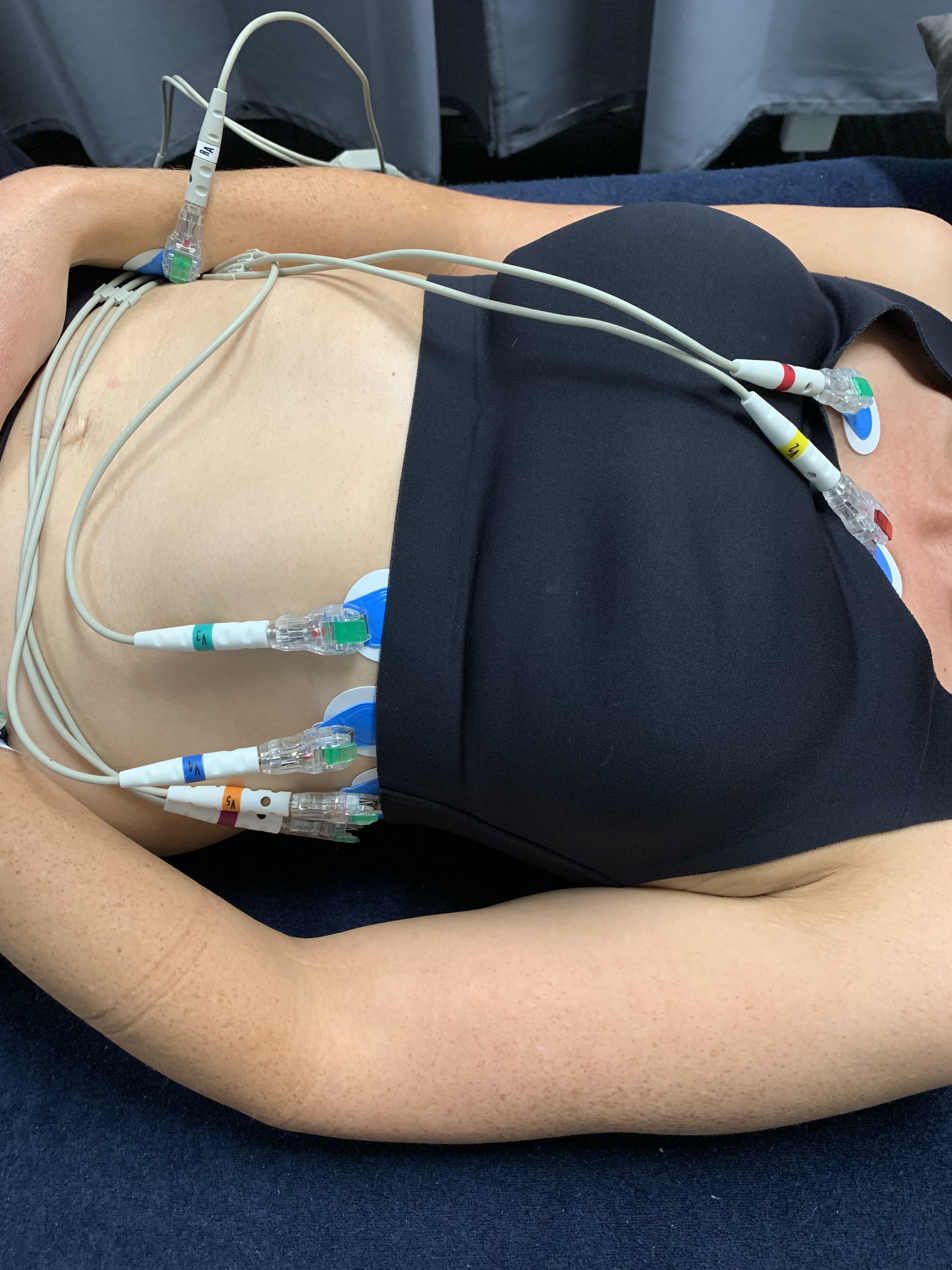
ECG of an athlete

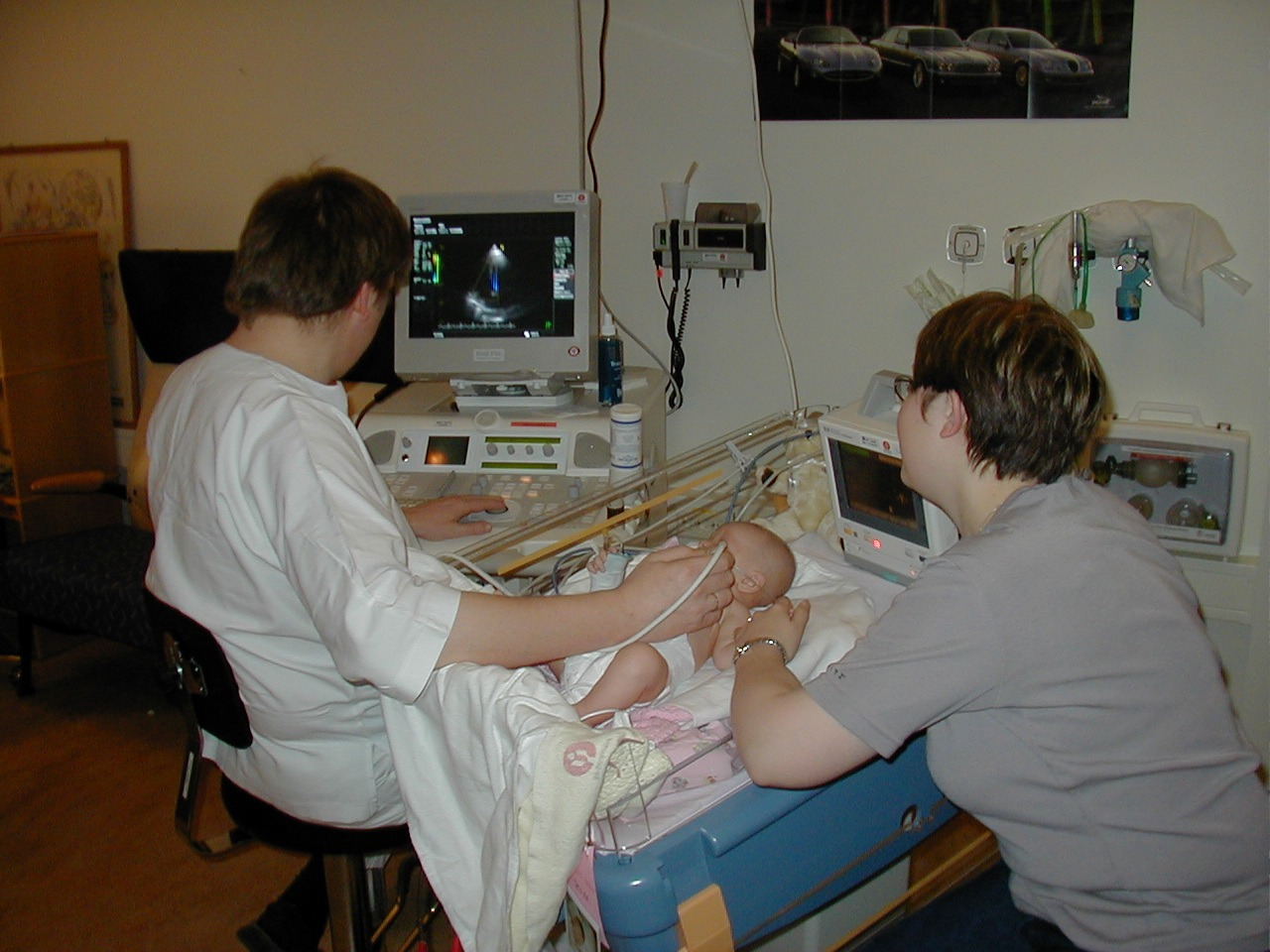
Child having echocardiogram

== Pre-participation Screening ==
In a few well-trained athletes, the normal 10% to 20% increase in left ventricular wall thickness may make it less easy to differentiate an athletic heart from HCM. In HCM, the 12-lead ECG typically shows T wave inversion, ST depression and prominent Q waves, unlike the isolated LVH signs of a normal athletic heart. The ventricular cavity in athletes may also be 10% to 15% greater than in comparable non-athletes.

Particularly for black athletes, some of their ECG characteristics are more likely to cross over with those seen in HCM. If interpreted incorrectly, it has the possibility of leading to being wrongly reassured or even incorrectly diagnosed with HCM leading to being unfairly disqualified. Limited studies mean it is unclear what structural adaptations occur in the hearts of other ethnicities. Limited literature on screening Arab and African male athletes shows a high false positive rate; that is the tests indicate they have the disease when they don't.

== Physical Exam Findings ==
There are some physical exam findings that can alert you to look further for HCM. Though some patients can be asymptomatic, it is helpful to associate certain findings with a greater chance of HCM being present. The murmur heard in HCM (or HOCM, if obstructive) is a systolic ejection crescendo-decrescendo murmur. The intensity of this murmur can vary based on the degree of obstruction. This murmur can also change in intensity based on different maneuvers that can be accomplished with the body. The murmur will decrease with maneuvers that cause an increase in preload, such as squatting. It will also decrease with maneuvers that increase afterload, such as hand grip. Conversely, the murmur will increase with maneuvers that decrease preload, such as Valsalva, giving diuretics, and standing. A holosystolic murmur heard at the apex or axilla can indicate mitral regurgitation, which can be found in patients with HCM. Other physical exam findings that may be present are a jugular venous pulse with a prominent A wave, an S4 heart sound, and split second heart sounds with severe disease and prominent outflow tract obstruction.

== Global variation ==
HCM has traditionally been of greater interest in Europe, North America, Japan, Israel, and Australia.

== Research directions ==
As of 2020, research on heart adaptations in females, teenagers and Asian populations is required.
