= Preparticipation physical evaluation =

Physical examination of athletes in sports medicine

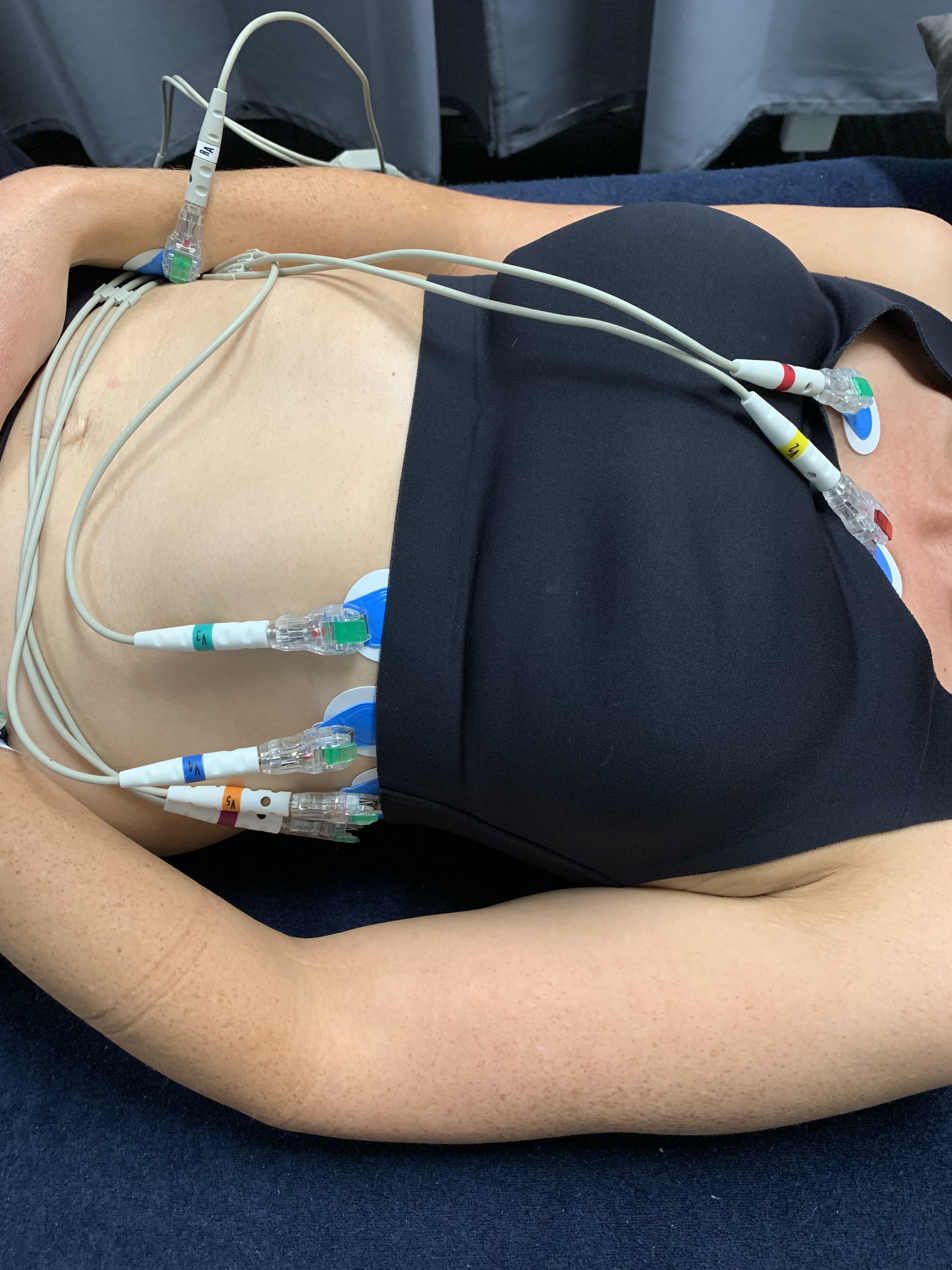
- ECG of an athlete
- Synonyms: PPE, preparticipation evaluation, preparticipation physical examination, preparticipation screening, sports physical, sports physical exam, examination for participation in sport

In sports medicine, a preparticipation physical evaluation (PPE) is a physical examination of an athlete. PPEs screen for a variety of conditions, including athletic heart syndrome and risk of sudden cardiac death. PPEs are required for athletic participation according to the laws of some jurisdictions and the rules of many sports governing bodies. PPE is known by a variety of other names, such as preparticipation evaluation, preparticipation physical examination, preparticipation screening, sports physical, sports physical exam, examination for participation in sport, and similar.

As of 2019, the latest PPE recommendation published by several US physician organizations is the 5th edition, called PPE5. PPE5 was published by American Academy of Pediatrics, American Academy of Family Physicians, American College of Sports Medicine, American Medical Society for Sports Medicine, American Orthopaedic Society for Sports Medicine, and American Osteopathic Academy of Sports Medicine. Additionally, PPE5 was endorsed by the National Athletic Trainers' Association and National Federation of State High School Associations.
