= Left atrial enlargement =

- Other names: Left atrial dilation
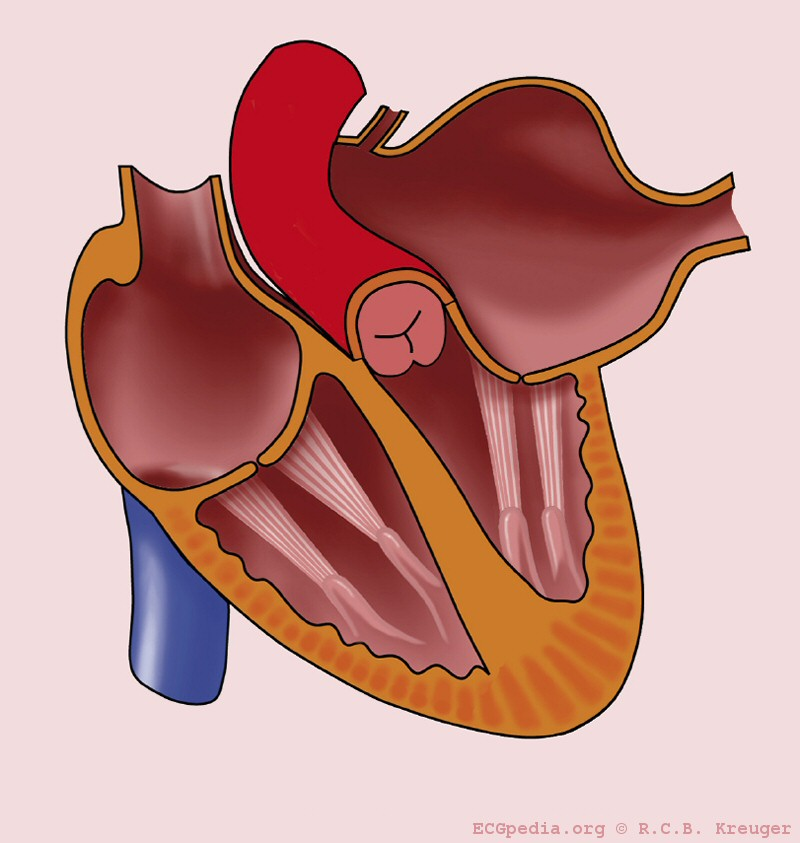
- Specialty: Cardiology

Left atrial enlargement (LAE) or left atrial dilation refers to enlargement of the left atrium (LA) of the heart, and is a form of cardiomegaly.

== Signs and symptoms ==
Left atrial enlargement can be mild, moderate or severe depending on the extent of the underlying condition. Although other factors may contribute, left atrium size has been found to be a predictor of mortality due to both cardiovascular issues as well as all-cause mortality. Research suggests that left atrium size as measured by an echocardiogram may be linked to cardiovascular disease. However, studies that have found LAE to be a predictor for mortality recognize the need for more standardized left atrium measurements than those found in an echocardiogram.

== Causes ==
In the general population, obesity appears to be the most important risk factor for LAE. LAE has been found to be correlated to body size, independent of obesity, meaning that LAE is more common in people with a naturally large body size. Also, a study found that LAE can occur as a consequence of atrial fibrillation (AF), although another study found that AF by itself does not cause LAE. The latter study also showed that the persistent type of AF was associated with LAE, but the number of years that a subject had AF was not.

Obstructive sleep apnea (OSA) may be a cause of LAE in some cases. When an OSA event occurs, an attempt is made to breathe with an obstructed airway and the pressure inside the chest is suddenly lowered. The negative intrathoracic pressure may cause the left atrium to expand and stretch its walls during each OSA event. Over time, the repetitive stretching of the left atrium may result in a persistent left atrial enlargement.

== Diagnosis ==
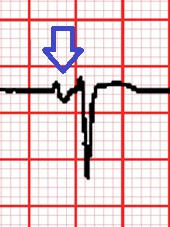
ECG of V1 showing the large negative of the P wave indicating left atrial enlargement

LAE is suggested by an electrocardiogram (ECG) that has a pronounced notch in the P wave. However, if atrial fibrillation is present, a P wave would not be present. In any case, LAE can be diagnosed and measured using an echocardiogram (ECHO) by measuring the left atrial volume (LAVI).

Characterizing the size of the left atrium according to its volume is preferred over a single linear dimension since enlargement can be different for different directions. For example, because of the smaller distance in the thoracic cavity between the sternum and spine, compared to the other directions, less room exists for enlargement of the left atrium along the anteroposterior axis. By approximating the shape of the left atrium as an ellipsoid, its volume can be calculated from measurements of its dimensions along three perpendicular directions.

Indexing the left atrial volume to body surface area (volume/BSA) is recommended by the American Society of Echocardiography and the European Association of Echocardiography. The values for volume/BSA are the same for both men and women.
