= Malacia =

Malacia is abnormal softening of a biological tissue, most often cartilage. The word is derived from Greek μαλακός, malakos = soft. Usually the combining form -malacia suffixed to another combining form that denotes the affected tissue assigns a more specific name to each such disorder, as follows:

- Osteomalacia (rickets), a bone disorder from vitamin D deficiency
- Chondromalacia, softening of cartilage (often refers to chondromalacia patellae when mentioned without further specification)
  - Chondromalacia patellae, a disorder of cartilage under the kneecap
  - Bronchomalacia, a disorder of the bronchial tubes' cartilage
  - Laryngomalacia, a disorder of the larynx's cartilage
  - Tracheomalacia, a disorder of the trachea's cartilage
  - Tracheobronchomalacia, a weakness of the trachea and bronchi causing them to collapse
- Keratomalacia, an eye disorder from vitamin A deficiency
- Myelomalacia, a disorder of the spinal cord
- Cerebral softening (encephalomalacia), localized softening of brain tissue
