= Double aortic arch =

- Other names: DAA

Double aortic arch is a relatively rare congenital cardiovascular malformation. DAA is an anomaly of the aortic arch in which two aortic arches form a complete vascular ring that can compress the trachea and/or esophagus. Most commonly there is a larger (dominant) right arch behind and a smaller (hypoplastic) left aortic arch in front of the trachea/esophagus. The two arches join to form the descending aorta which is usually on the left side (but may be right-sided or in the midline). In some cases the end of the smaller left aortic arch closes (left atretic arch) and the vascular tissue becomes a fibrous cord. Although in these cases a complete ring of two patent aortic arches is not present, the term ‘vascular ring’ is the accepted generic term even in these anomalies.

The symptoms are related to the compression of the trachea, esophagus or both by the complete vascular ring. Diagnosis can often be suspected or made by chest x-ray, barium esophagram, or echocardiography. Computed tomography (CT) or magnetic resonance imaging (MRI) show the relationship of the aortic arches to the trachea and esophagus and also the degree of tracheal narrowing. Bronchoscopy can be useful in internally assessing the degree of tracheomalacia. Treatment is surgical and is indicated in all symptomatic patients. In the current era the risk of mortality or significant morbidity after surgical division of the lesser arch is low. However, the preoperative degree of tracheomalacia has an important impact on postoperative recovery. In certain patients it may take several months (up to 1–2 years) for the obstructive respiratory symptoms (wheezing) to disappear.

== Signs and symptoms ==
Symptoms are caused by vascular compression of the airway, esophagus or both. Presentation is often within the first month (neonatal period) and usually within the first 6 months of life. Starting at birth an inspiratory and expiratory stridor (high pitch noise from turbulent airflow in trachea) may be present often in combination with an expiratory wheeze. The severity of the stridor may depend on the patient’s body position. It can be worse when the baby is lying on their back rather than their side. Sometimes the stridor can be relieved by extending the neck (lifting the chin up). Parents may notice that the baby’s cry is hoarse and the breathing noisy. Frequently a persistent cough is present. When the airway obstruction is significant there may be episodes of severe cyanosis (“blue baby”) that can lead to unconsciousness. Recurrent respiratory infections are common and secondary pulmonary secretions can further increase the airway obstruction.

Secondary to compression of the esophagus babies often feed poorly. They may have difficulties in swallowing liquids with choking or regurgitating and increased respiratory obstruction during feeding. Older patients might refuse to take solid food, although most infants with severe symptoms nowadays are operated upon before they are offered solid food. Occasionally patients with double aortic arches present late (during later childhood or adulthood). Symptoms may mimic asthma.

== Causes ==
Little is known regarding the exact causes of aortic arch anomalies. However, the association with chromosome 22q11 deletion (DiGeorge Syndrome) implies that a genetic component is likely in certain cases. Esophageal atresia also occurs in some patients with double aortic arch.

== Diagnosis ==
Prenatal diagnosis (fetal ultrasound): Today the diagnosis of double aortic arch can be obtained in-utero in experienced centers. Scheduled repair soon after birth in symptomatic patients can relieve tracheal compression early and therefore potentially prevent the development of severe tracheomalacia.

Chest X-ray: Plain chest x-rays of patients with double aortic arch may appear normal (often) or show a dominant right aortic arch or two aortic arches . There might be evidence of tracheal deviation and/or compression. Sometimes patients present with radiologic findings of pneumonia.

Barium swallow (esophagraphy): Historically the esophagram used to be the gold standard for diagnosis of double aortic arch. In patients with double aortic arch the esophagus shows left- and right-sided indentations from the vascular compression. Due to the blood-pressure related movement of the aorta and the two arches, moving images of the barium-filled esophagus can demonstrate the typical pulsatile nature of the obstruction. The indentation from a dominant right arch is usually deeper and higher compared to the dent from the left arch.

Bronchoscopy: Although bronchoscopy is not routinely done in patients with suspected or confirmed double aortic arch, it can visualize sites and severity of pulsatile tracheal compression.

Echocardiography: In babies under the age of 12 months, echocardiography is considered to be sensitive and specific in making the diagnosis of double aortic arch when both arches are open. Non-perfused elements of other types of vascular rings (e.g. left arch with atretic (closed) end) or the ligamentum arteriosum might be difficult to visualize by echocardiography.

Computed tomography (CT): Computed tomography after application of contrast media is usually diagnostically accurate. It shows the relationship of the arches to the trachea and bronchi.

Magnetic resonance imaging (MRI): Magnetic resonance imaging provides excellent images of the trachea and surrounding vascular structures and has the advantage of not using radiation for imaging compared to Computed tomography.

Cardiac catherization/aortography: Today patients with double aortic arch usually only undergo cardiac catherization to evaluate the hemodynamics and anatomy of associated congenital cardiac defects. Through a catheter in the ascending aorta contrast media is injected and the resulting aortography may be used to delineate the anatomy of the double aortic arch including sites of narrowing in the left aortic arch. Aortography can also be used to visualize the origin of all head and arm vessels originating from the two arches.

=== Classification ===
Double aortic arch is a subtype of complete vascular ring. There are three types of double aortic arch:

- Right dominant arch (about 70% of surgical cases)
- Balanced or codominant (about 5%): both arches are of equal size
- Left dominant (about 25%)

Double aortic arch with right dominant arch: Normally there is only one (left) aortic arch. In patients with double aortic arch the ascending aorta arises normally from the left ventricle but then divides into two arches, a left and a right aortic arch which join posteriorly to become the descending aorta.

The smaller left arch passes anteriorly and to the left of the trachea in the usual position. It is often joined by the ligamentum arteriosum (or patent ductus arteriosus) where it forms the descending aorta. The left arch gives first origin to the left common carotid artery and then the left subclavian artery.

The right aortic arch is completing the vascular ring by passing to the right and then behind the esophagus and trachea to join the usually left-sided descending aorta. The first vessel coming off the right arch is usually the right common carotid artery followed by the right subclavian artery.

Double aortic arch with left dominant arch: In this less common condition, as the name indicates, the left arch is the larger of the two aortic arches. The origins of the arm and head vessels are identical to the anatomy of double aortic arch with right dominant arch

Balanced or codominant double aortic arch: In this rare condition both aortic arches are of the same diameter.

== Treatment ==
Surgical correction is indicated in all double aortic arch patients with obstructive symptoms (stridor, wheezing, pulmonary infections, poor feeding with choking). If symptoms are absent a conservative approach (watchful waiting) can be reasonable. Children with very mild symptoms may outgrow their symptoms but need regular follow-up.

=== Anesthesia and intraoperative monitoring ===
The procedure is performed in general anesthesia. It is useful to place pulse oximeter probes on both hands and one foot so that test occlusion of one arch or its branches will allow confirmation of the anatomy. In addition blood pressure cuffs should also be placed on one leg and both arms to confirm the absence of a pressure gradient when the intended point of division of the lesser arch is temporarily occluded with forceps.

=== Open division of vascular ring ===
Isolated double aortic arch without associated intracardiac defects is a vascular anomaly that can be corrected without the support of cardiopulmonary bypass.

For surgical division of the narrower left aortic arch in a typical double arch patient with a dominant right arch, the patient is placed on the right side. After prepping and draping of the left chest a posterolateral thoracotomy is performed. The chest cavity is entered between the fourth and fifth rib (fourth intercostal space, as in the operation for patent ductus arteriosus or coarctation). After pulling the left lung aside, the layer (mediastinal pleura) above the left arch is incised and the left arch and the ligamentum arteriosum are dissected out and separated from the surrounding structures. The ligamentum is divided and two vascular clamps are placed on the junction of the left arch with the descending aorta. After division the two aortic ends are oversewn with 2 running layers of non-absorbable sutures. The end of the left arch is now further dissected from the mediastinal tissues for relief of any remaining constricting mechanism. The medial surface of the descending aorta and the distal end are also carefully dissected away from the esophagus. Additional relief can be obtained by stitching the lateral wall of the aorta to the adjacent rib to pull it away from the esophagus.

After insertion of a chest tube to prevent hemothorax and/or pneumothorax, the fourth and fifth rib are approximated by an absorbable suture. The surgery is completed by closure of the left thoracotomy wound in layers.

In most centers, the mortality risk for surgery is between zero and 2%. A specific risk of open surgical repair of double aortic arch is injury to the recurrent laryngeal nerve, which can cause vocal cord paralysis. Injury to the lymphatic system can lead to postoperative chylothorax. Additional risks include lung injury, bleeding with the need for blood transfusions and wound infection.

=== Postoperative care ===
After the surgery, some patients require intubation and mechanical ventilation for several days to allow adequate tracheal toilet, but most patients can have the tubes removed soon after the surgery. The obstructive airway symptoms may be worse in the first postoperative weeks. Only a few patients have immediate relief of stridor, but many obtain immediate relief of problems with swallowing (dysphagia). After extubation, it might be necessary to maintain positive airway pressure by appropriate flows of a humidified oxygen/air mixture.

== Epidemiology ==
Complete vascular rings represent about 0.5-1% of all congenital cardiovascular malformations. The majority of these are double aortic arches. There is no known gender preference, i.e. males and females are about equally affected. There is also no known ethnic or geographic disposition.

Associated cardiovascular anomalies are found in 10-15% of patients. These include:

- Atrial septal defect (ASD)
- Ventricular septal defect (VSD)
- Patent ductus arteriosus (PDA)
- Tetralogy of Fallot (ToF)
- Transposition of the great arteries (D-TGA)

== History ==
Congenital abnormalities of the aortic arch have been known for a long time. The first postmortem description of double aortic arch was in 1737 by Hommell. In 1837 von Siebold published a case report in the German medical literature entitled "Ringfoermiger Aortenbogen bei einem neugeborenen blausuechtigen Kinde" (Ring-shaped aortic arch in a cyanotic neonate).

With the use of barium esophagography it became possible to diagnose aortic arch anomalies during life in the 1930s. The first open surgical correction via thoracotomy was performed by Robert E. Gross at Children’s Hospital Boston in 1945. Gross is one of the pioneers of cardiovascular surgery, who also performed the first successful ligation of a patent ductus arteriosus 7 years earlier. The basis for the radiologic diagnosis by barium swallow (esophagram) of double aortic arch (and other forms of vascular rings) was described in 1946 by Neuhauser from the same institution.

Certain types of double aortic arch with a left arch that is small in diameter (less than 2 or 3mm patent) or atretic might be suitable for a so-called minimally invasive video-assisted thoracoscopic surgery (VATS) approach.
