= Tracheomalacia =

Tracheal disease

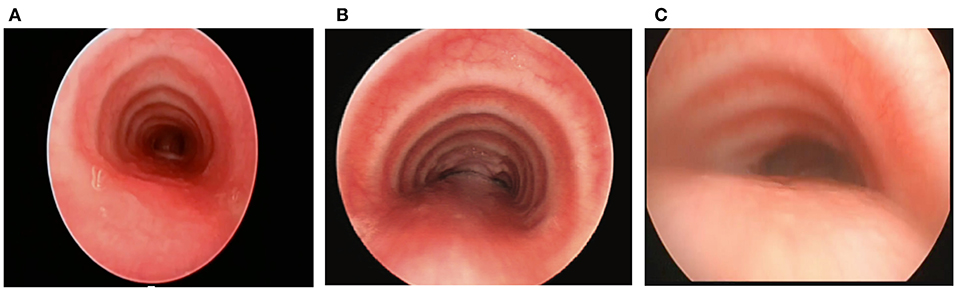
- (A) Tracheal structure with normal C-shape rings. (B) U-shaped rings with a wider posterior membrane, demonstrating posterior intrusion. (C) Bow-shaped rings with a broad posterior membrane and severe posterior intrusion.
- Pronunciation: /ˌtreɪkioʊməˈleɪʃə/ TRAY-kee-oh-mə-LAY-shə
- Specialty: Pulmonology
- Symptoms: Wheezing, dyspnea and fatigue upon exertion Infants may show signs of cyanosis
- Complications: Inability to propel secretions, leading to repeated cases of pneumonia
- Types: Congenital (heart/great vessel malformations or tracheal anomalies); Acquired (secondary to trauma or tracheostomy)
- Diagnostic method: Endoscopy (diagnostic); flexible laryngobronchoscopy (confirmation)
- Prevention: Avoiding hard throat impacts
- Treatment: Symptomatic management (PEEP or CPAP) for mild symptoms Surgery indicated for tracheal compression from large vessel or mass
- Prognosis: Severe tracheomalacia is associated with significant morbidity and mortality

Tracheomalacia is a condition or incident where the cartilage that keeps the airway (trachea) open is soft, such that the trachea partly collapses especially during increased airflow. This condition is most commonly seen in infants and young children. The usual symptom is stridor when a person breathes out. This is usually known as a collapsed windpipe.

The trachea normally opens slightly during breathing in and narrows slightly during breathing out. These processes are exaggerated in tracheomalacia, leading to airway collapse on breathing out.

If the condition extends further to the large airways (bronchi) (if there is also bronchomalacia), it is termed tracheobronchomalacia. The same condition can also affect the larynx, which is called laryngomalacia. The term is from trachea and the Ancient Greek μαλακία (malakía) meaning 'softening'.

== Signs and symptoms ==
Tracheomalacia occurs when the walls of the trachea collapse. This can happen because the walls of the windpipe are weak, or it can happen because something is pressing on it. This may include hypotonia of the trachealis muscle. The whole windpipe can be affected, or only a short piece of it. If the collapsed part of the windpipe goes past the area where the windpipe branches off into the two lungs, it is called bronchomalacia.

This problem causes noisy or difficult breathing in the first 1 to 2 months after birth. This is called congenital tracheomalacia (it was present at birth). It is not very common. Babies born with tracheomalacia may have other health issues like a heart defect, reflux or developmental delay. Some children get tracheomalacia because of other health issues. Symptoms can be mild to severe.

Symptoms inside the lung include noisy breathing that may get better when you change your baby's position or while they are asleep. Breathing problems that get worse during coughing, crying, feeding or colds. High-pitched sound during breathing (stridor). High-pitched cough. Rattling noise or wheezing with breathing.

== Diagnosis ==
There is no standardized, defined set of diagnostic criteria for the diagnosis of tracheomalacia, mainly due to the nonspecific symptoms associated with it. Current diagnostic approaches include pulmonary function testing which shows a characteristic reduction in peak expiratory flow (PEF), physical examination, and imaging such as computed tomography (CT) or magnetic resonance imaging (MRI), fiberoptic bronchoscopy (FB) is considered the best diagnostic method because an inserted camera down the throat shows a direct view of the airways and lungs, detecting changes in the size or appearance of the trachea's lumen and mucosa and any signs of inflammation, fistulas, or external compressions to precisely determine the location and severity of the malacia. Cross-sectional radiological images are important in detecting mediastinal structures involved in TM prior to surgery. Tracheography/Bronchography is no longer a preferred diagnostic method. Bronchography provides an accurate measurement of the airway lumen with a dynamic and morphological evaluation of the tracheobronchial tree. However, this requires the injection of contrast material within the narrowed airway. Risks include allergic reaction, airway plugging, or complete airway obstruction.

=== Classifications ===
There are three types of tracheomalacia:

- Type 1—congenital, sometimes associated with tracheoesophageal fistula or esophageal atresia
- Type 2—extrinsic compression sometimes due to vascular rings
- Type 3—acquired due to chronic infection or prolonged intubation or inflammatory conditions like relapsing polychondritis

== Treatment ==
According to the 2012 Cochrane review, there is no evidence supporting medical therapy over surgical therapy for significant tracheomalacia, or vice versa. Current recommendations for mild to moderate non-life-threatening tracheomalacia focuses on symptom management.

- Regular use of hypertonic saline nebulizers
- Low dose inhaled steroids may help decrease airway inflammation and swelling
- Inhaled Ipratropium may help decrease secretions and stiffen smaller airways
- Antibiotics during active respiratory infection may decrease severity and length of symptoms
- Continuous Positive Airway Pressure (CPAP) provides additional intraluminal pressure

Life is usually saved if the airway is opened via a hole in the throat. If a person survives, they may have symptoms, but usually will get better after the airway is reopened. If the symptoms are severe enough, treatment may be needed. These range from medical management over mechanical ventilation (both continuous positive airway pressure (CPAP) or bi-level positive airway pressure (BiPAP)), to inserting a tracheal stent and surgery.

Surgical techniques include aortopexy, tracheopexy, tracheobronchoplasty, and tracheostomy. The role of the nebulised recombinant human deoxyribonuclease (rhDNase) remains inconclusive.

== See also ==
- Tracheal collapse for the condition in dogs
