= Right-sided aortic arch =

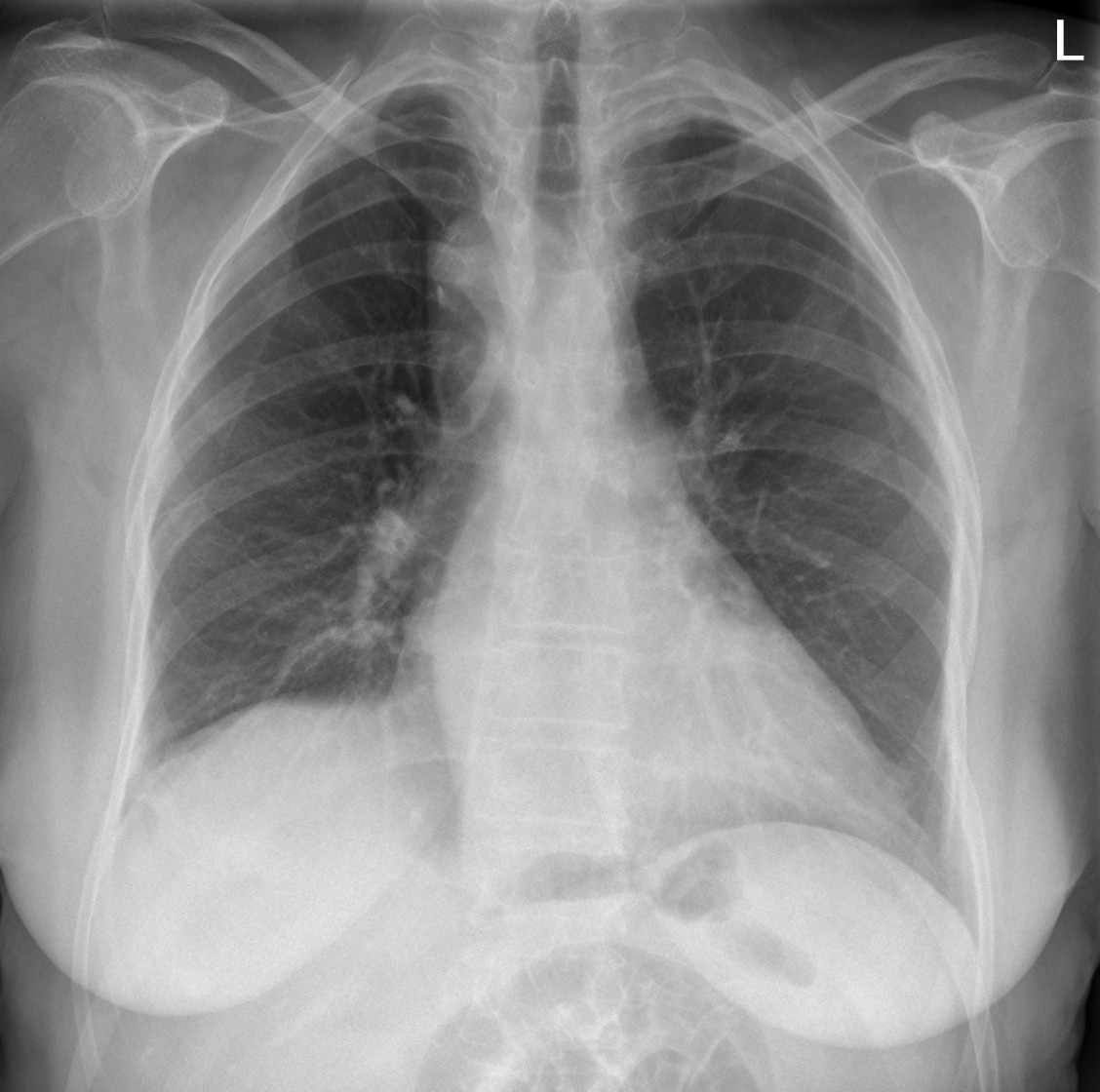
- Anterior-posterior chest radiograph showing a right-sided aortic arch

Right-sided aortic arch is a rare anatomical variant in which the aortic arch is on the right side rather than on the left. During normal embryonic development, the aortic arch is formed by the left fourth aortic arch and the left dorsal aorta. In people with a right-sided aortic arch, instead the right dorsal aorta persists and the distal left aorta disappears.

== Symptoms and signs ==
A right-sided aortic arch does not cause symptoms on itself, and the overwhelming majority of people with the right-sided arch have no other symptoms. However, when it is accompanied by other vascular abnormalities, it may form a vascular ring, causing symptoms due to compression of the trachea and/or esophagus.

== Pathophysiology ==
The causes of right-sided aortic arch are still unknown, 22q11 deletions have been found in some people with this condition. It has also been found in association with other genetic syndromes such as Trisomy 21 (Down syndrome).

== Diagnosis ==
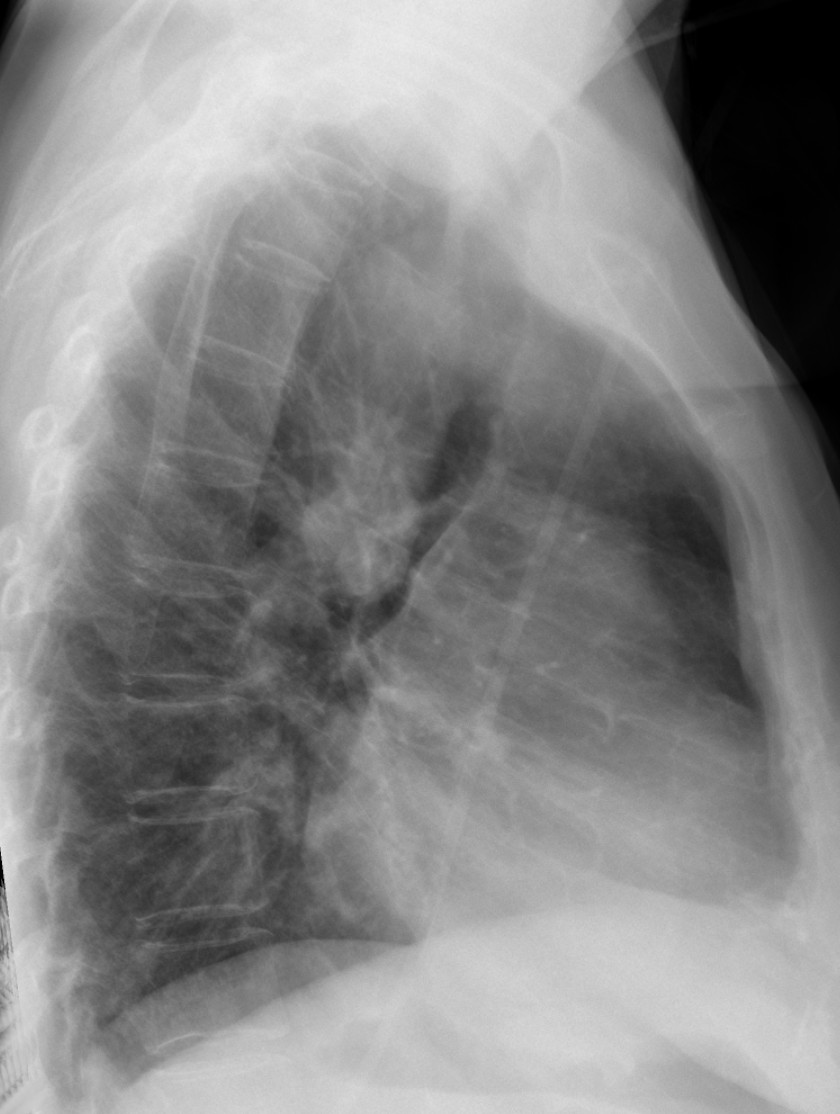
Chest radiograph showing a right-sided aortic arch, lateral view

During pregnancy, prenatal ultrasound may reveal the abnormal course of the arch and this is the most common reason for identification of a right sided aortic arch nowadays. Sometimes, when a right sided aortic arch is seen before birth, it can actually be a double aortic arch, sometimes a fetal MRI scan may be helpful if the ultrasound is not clear.

After birth, a right-sided aortic arch is visualized on chest radiography, by the aortic knob (the prominent shadow of the aortic arch) that is located right from the sternum instead of left. Complex lesions are often assessed by MRI or CT.

=== Classification ===
Several types of right-sided aortic arch exist, the most common ones being right-sided aortic arch with aberrant left subclavian artery and the mirror-image type. The variant with aberrant left subclavian artery is associated with congenital heart disease in only a small minority of affected people. The mirror-image type of right aortic arch is very strongly associated with congenital heart disease, in most cases tetralogy of Fallot.

== Management ==
If a right aortic arch is associated with a left sided arterial ductal ligament (a remnant from the foetal circulation which forms a ligament after birth) then a vascular ring is formed around the trachea. Studies show that around 1:4 children show symptoms of a vascular ring. This requires further investigation by specialists. Many children are well. There is evidence to show that symptoms of a vascular ring do not correlate with the appearance of the trachea in these patients so further assessment may be required. This could be in the form of a specialist CT scan which is timed with inspiration and expiration or a free breathing bronchoscopy.

If required, repairing a vascular ring formed by a right sided aortic arch usually involves dividing the left sided arterial ductal ligament (this is not a structure that is necessary for the heart circulation as it is not a vessel after birth). This is usually performed by cardiothoracic surgeons from the side of the chest (thoracotomy incision) and does not require the heart to be stopped like many heart surgeries. Some people may have an aberrant left subclavian artery (the artery to the left arm) and this may also require re-implantation as it adds to the complexity of the vascular ring.

== Epidemiology ==
Right-sided aortic arch is rare, with a prevalence among adults of about 0.01%.

== See also ==
- Aortic arches
