= Brachiocephalic artery =

Artery of the mediastinum

Brachiocephalic artery.
- Schematic of the proximal aorta, frontal view. The brachiocephalic artery is the third branch of the aorta and the first branch from the arch of the aorta. The heart in the lower left is not shown.

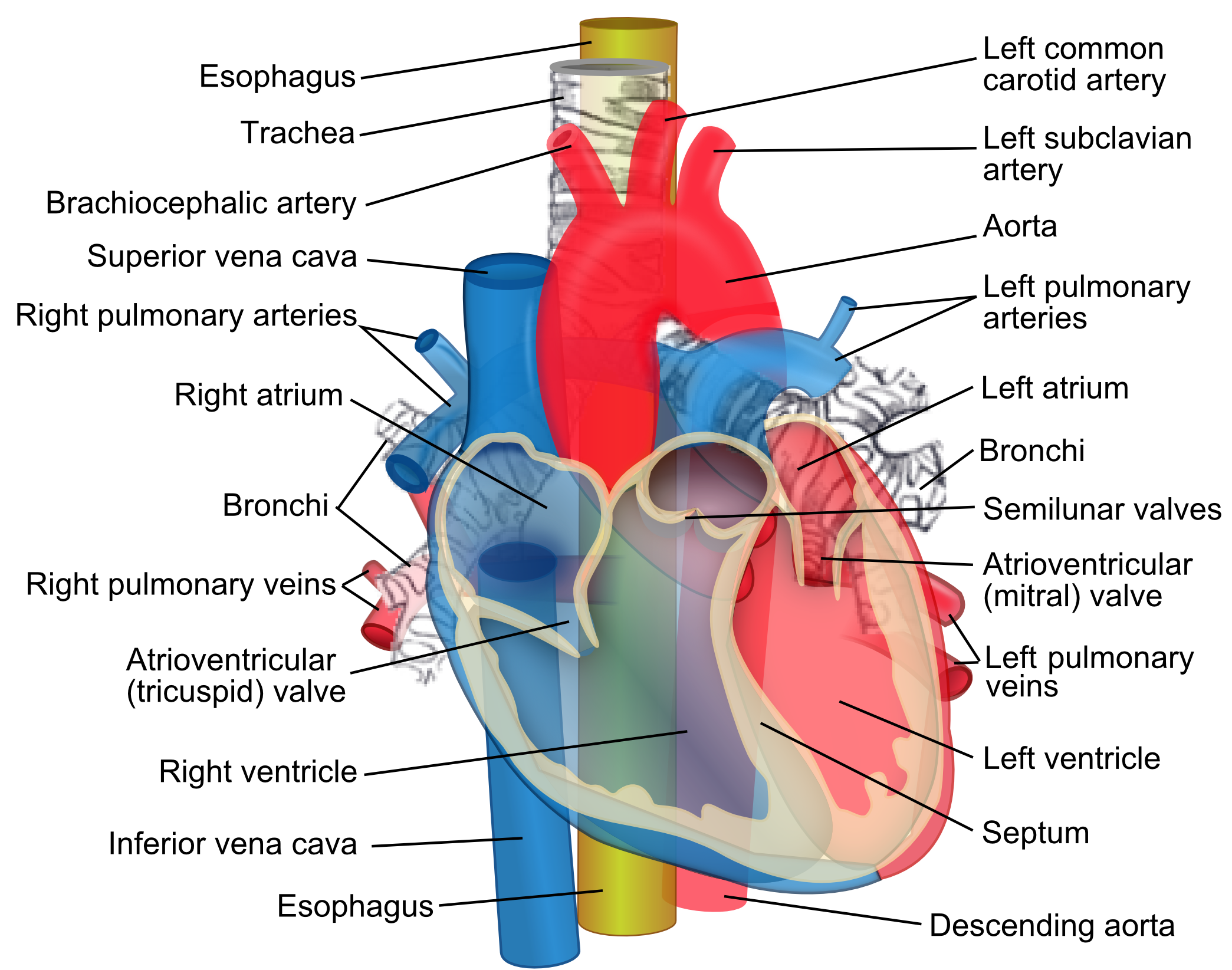
- Course of the ascending aorta (anterior view), as it passes dorsally to the pulmonary trunk but ventrally to the right pulmonary artery.

Details
- Precursor: Right horn of aortic sac
- Source: Aortic arch
- Branches: Right common carotid artery Right subclavian artery Thyroid ima artery (occasionally)
- Vein: Brachiocephalic vein

Identifiers
- Latin: truncus brachiocephalicus
- MeSH: D016122
- TA98: A12.2.04.004
- TA2: 4179
- FMA: 3932

The brachiocephalic artery, brachiocephalic trunk, or innominate artery is an artery of the mediastinum that supplies blood to the right arm, head, and neck.

It is the first branch of the aortic arch. Soon after it emerges, the brachiocephalic artery divides into the right common carotid artery and the right subclavian artery.

There is no brachiocephalic artery for the left side of the body. The left common carotid artery and the left subclavian artery come directly off the aortic arch. Despite this, there are two brachiocephalic veins.

== Structure ==
The brachiocephalic artery arises on a level with the upper border of the second right costal cartilage from the start of the aortic arch on a plane anterior to the origin of the left carotid artery. It ascends obliquely upward, backward, and to the right to the level of the upper border of the right sternoclavicular articulation, where it divides into the right common carotid artery and right subclavian arteries. The artery then crosses the trachea in front of it obliquely from the left to the right, roughly at the middle of the trachea or the level of the ninth tracheal cartilage.

=== Relations ===
The brachiocephalic artery has relation with:

- anterior - left brachiocephalic vein and thymus
- posterior - trachea
- right - superior vena cava, right brachiocephalic vein, and pleura
- left - left common carotid artery and thymus

The thymus typically sits atop the brachiocephalic artery, and it separates the artery from the posterior surface of the manubrium of sternum.

=== Branches ===
The thyroid ima artery ascends in front of the trachea to the lower part of the thyroid, which it supplies.

=== Variation ===
The innominate artery usually gives off no branches, but occasionally a small branch, the thyroid ima artery, arises from it. Other times, it gives off a thymic or bronchial branch.

Thyroid ima artery varies greatly in size, and appears to compensate for deficiency or absence of one of the other thyroid vessels. It occasionally arises from the aorta, the right common carotid, the subclavian or the internal mammary.

== Development ==
The aortic sac is the embryological precursor of the proximal portion of the aortic arch. It is chronologically the first portion of the aorta to form, and appears as a dilation superior to the truncus arteriosus. Between the two horns of aortic sac, right horn gives rise to the brachiocephalic artery. Then the right horn fuses with the right-sided third and fourth aortic arches, which give rise to the right common carotid artery and the proximal right subclavian artery respectively. Eventually, brachiocephalic artery is derived from ventral aorta, same as ascending aorta. Left horn forms proximal ascending portion of aorta.

== Function ==
The brachiocephalic artery sends blood from the heart to the right arm, head, and neck. Oxygenated blood from the aortic trunk is taken through the brachiocephalic artery into the right subclavian artery, which transports blood to the right arm, and into the right common carotid artery, where blood is transported to the head and neck.

== Clinical significance ==
Innominate artery aneurysms represent 3% of all arterial aneurysms. Because there is a risk of thromboembolic complications and spontaneous rupture, surgical repair is usually recommended early on after discovery. Innominate artery aneurysms often present with signs of innominate artery compression syndrome and have a very high risk of rupture. The majority of IA aneurysms are due to atherosclerosis. Other causes include syphilis, tuberculosis, Kawasaki's disease, Takayasu's arteritis, Behçet's disease, connective tissue disease, and angiosarcoma.

Tracheoinnominate fistula (TIF) is a surgical emergency with high mortality rates. Reported incidence is 0.1%-1.0% after tracheostomy. TIF is usually fatal once it bleeds. For the successful management of TIF, treatment should be initiated immediately with special considerations kept in mind.

Several abnormalities of the brachiocephalic artery have been reported. A retroesophageal innominate artery is a rare congenital anomaly. Also, aberrant innominate artery crossing anterior to the trachea just below the thyroid isthmus was reported. Anterior neck surgeries such as bronchoscopies and mediastinoscopies are common and safe procedure, since operating around the trachea, no major vessel is encountered in the surgical field. However, when this type of abnormality is encountered, even minor trauma can lead to mass bleeding culminating in death. Aberrant innominate artery can cause incomplete vascular ring. It does not completely encircle the trachea and esophagus, but some compress either the trachea or esophagus. Anomalous innominate artery originates later from the transverse arch and then crosses the trachea causing anterior tracheal compression.

== Additional images ==
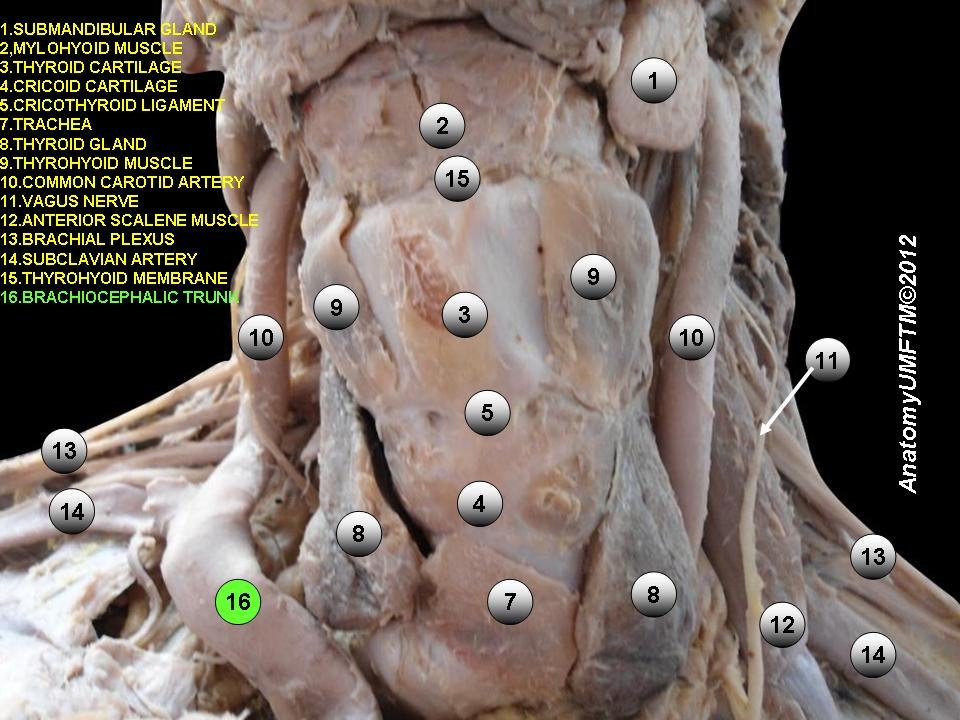
Brachiocephalic artery

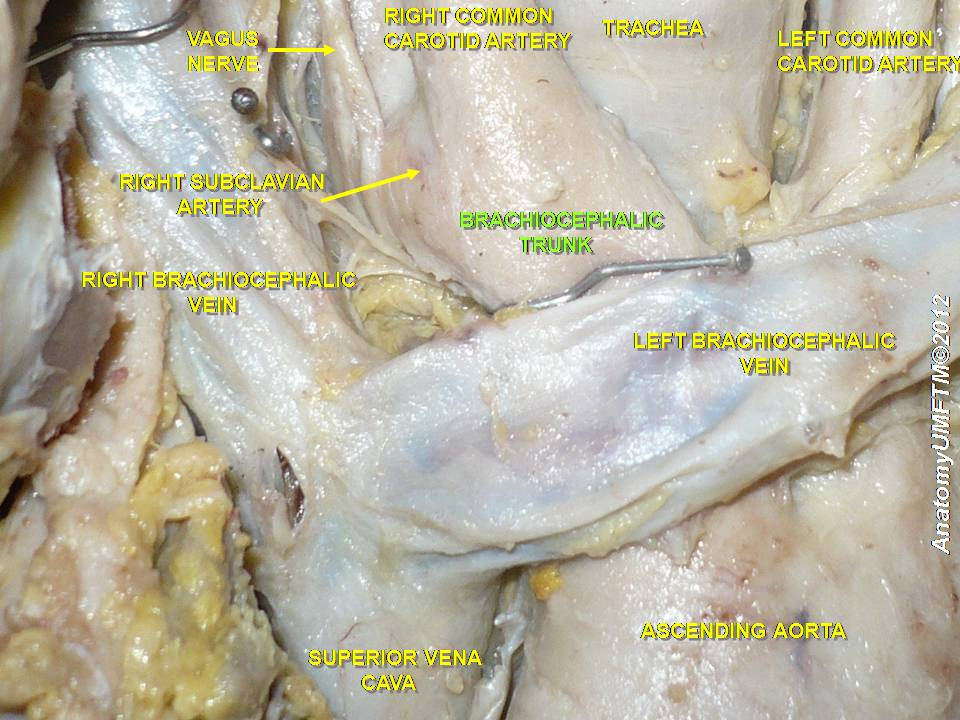
Brachiocephalic trunk

== See also ==
- Hip bone (Innominate bone)
