= Tracheobronchomalacia =

- Other names: Excessive Dynamic Airway Collapse
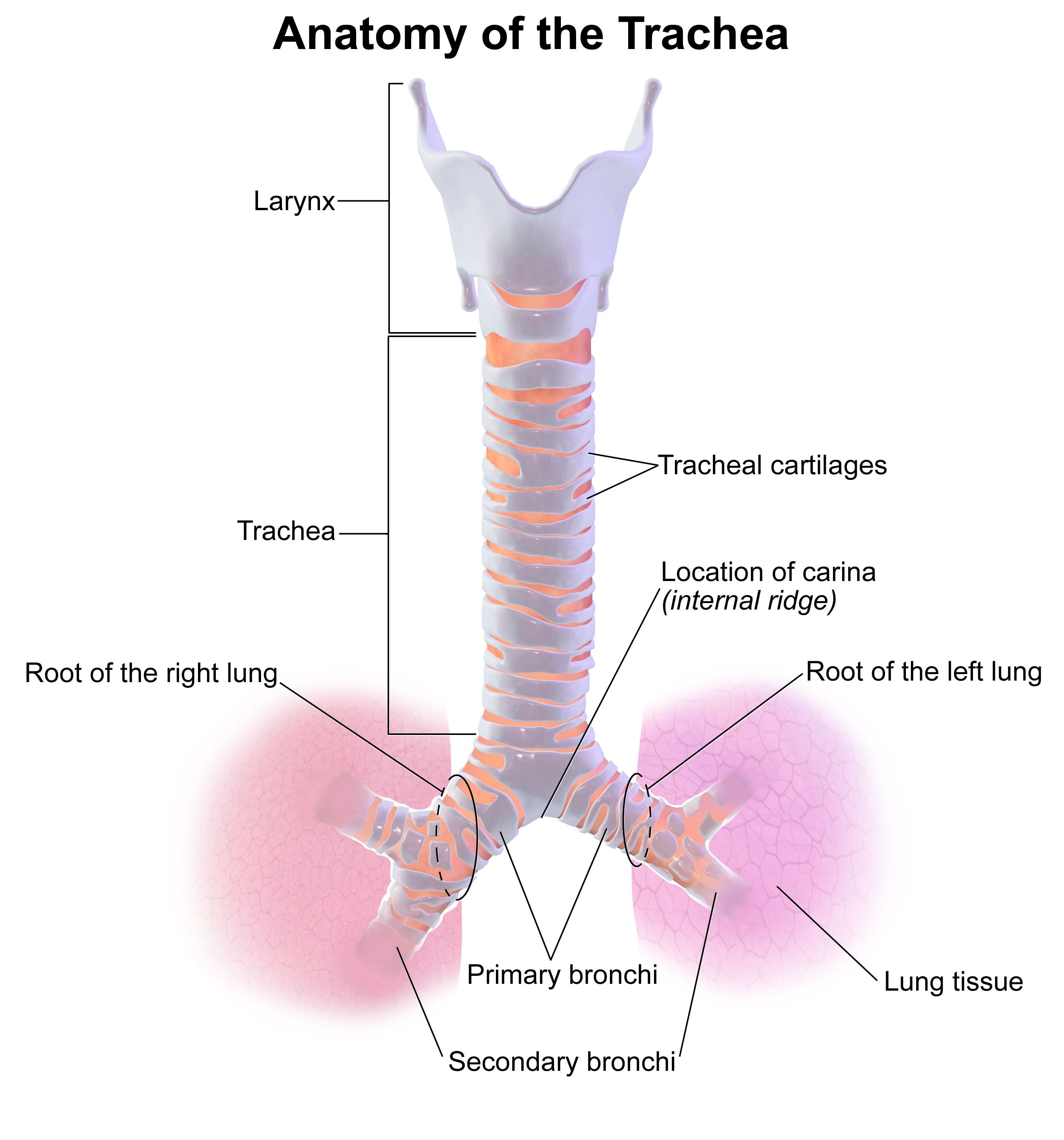
- Trachea anatomy
- Specialty: Pulmonology
- Symptoms: Chronic cough, stridor, inability to raise secretions, breathlessness
- Usual onset: From birth (Congenital ), Adulthood (Acquired)
- Duration: Congenital: Significant improvement after 18-24 months although some symptoms may be present for life. Acquired: Long-term.
- Risk factors: Relapsing polychondritis, Chronic obstructive pulmonary disease, Asthma, Cystic fibrosis, Gastroesophageal reflux disease (GERD), Heritable connective tissue disorders (Particularly Ehlers-Danlos Syndrome), Prolonged tracheal intubation, Long-term use of inhaled corticosteroids
- Diagnostic method: Bronchoscopy, Dynamic Expiratory Computed Tomography
- Differential diagnosis: Asthma, Chronic Obstructive Pulmonary Disease (COPD), Bronchiectasis, Cystic fibrosis, Tracheal stenosis, Tracheal tumors, Laryngomalacia
- Prevention: Treatment of inflammatory disorders of the airway, avoiding hard impacts
- Treatment: Continuous Positive Airway Pressure (CPAP), Airway Stenting, Aortopexy, Tracheopexy, Tracheobronchoplasty
- Prognosis: Variable: Disease can range from asymptomatic to life-threatening

Tracheobronchomalacia (TBM) is a condition characterized by flaccidity of the tracheal support cartilage which leads to tracheal collapse. This condition can also affect the bronchi. There are two forms of this condition: primary TBM and secondary TBM. Primary TBM is congenital and starts as early as birth. It is mainly linked to genetic causes. Secondary TBM is acquired and starts in adulthood. It is mainly developed after an accident or chronic inflammation.

Tracheobronchomalacia may also occur in people who have normal cartilaginous structure of the trachea, but significant atrophy of the posterior wall, causing significant invagination of the trachea on expiration. In these cases it is more commonly known as excessive dynamic airway collapse (EDAC).

== Signs and symptoms ==
Initially TBM may be asymptomatic or some patients do not experience symptoms at all. In a progressive TBM case symptoms include:

- shortness of breath
- a cough
- mucus build up
- stridor (a wheeze-like sound on breathing out)
- difficulty in breathing
- bluish coloration to skin around the nose and mouth
- Chronic cough

Symptoms may become worse if the patient is stressed, sick, lying down, or forcing a cough.

== Cause ==
Congenital TBM is present from birth. Acquired TBM often has no clear cause but is frequently found together with other pulmonary diseases like asthma and Chronic obstructive pulmonary disease, as well as Gastroesophageal reflux disease. TBM can be caused by damage to the support cartilage or membranous wall of the trachea, this can be the result of physical trauma (such as from prolonged Tracheal intubation) or pathological changes caused by inflammatory diseases like Relapsing polychondritis. In patients with TBM in one study, the number of longitudinal elastic fibers in the pars of membranacea was reduced throughout the whole trachea.

People with heritable connective tissue disorders like Ehlers–Danlos syndrome seem to have at an increased risk of both congenital and acquired TBM, although the extent of that risk is unknown.

There have been studies linking long-term use of inhaled Corticosteroids to Tracheobronchomalacia.

== Diagnosis ==
Diagnosis is conducted according to the severity of the symptoms. Initially pulmonary function tests are administered. These tests include the lungs' capability of air intake and outtake, and gas flow of oxygen and carbon dioxide between the body and environment. Following these function tests a special type of Chest CT scan or a bronchoscopy will be ordered. The results of the scan and bronchoscopy will display the status of the condition. A mild case of tracheobronchomalacia would be if the patient's trachea condenses 50% of its normal space when exhaling. Moderate tracheobronchomalacia would be 25% of the normal trachea space constricting and a severe case would be if the walls touch each other.

Tracheobronchomalacia is thought to be underdiagnosed as mild cases may be asymptomatic and symptoms are often mistaken for more common respiratory conditions like Asthma and Chronic obstructive pulmonary disease.

== Treatment ==
To properly treat a patient with tracheobronchomalacia, the subtype must be determined (primary or secondary). After the type is named, the cause must be identified, whether it is from genetics, a trauma accident, or chronic tracheal illness. If a trauma case or chronic tracheal illnesses were the cause, the first steps of treatment would be to address these underlying issues. If the cause is genetic or the previous underlying issues could not be fixed, other treatments would be assessed. More severe treatments include silicone stenting to prevent tracheal constriction, surgery to strengthen or attempt to rebuild the walls, continuous positive airway pressure that has a machine blow small amounts of air into the trachea to keep it open (mainly at night), or a tracheostomy, which is surgically inserted into the patient's neck that leads to the trachea to help with breathing. Another form of treatment may include a tracheobronchoplasty which is a specific surgical procedure that helps control the airway by splinting the trachea. The splint helps strengthen the trachea with the hopes that the symptoms improve. People with tracheobronchomalacia who do not experience symptoms do not need treatment and are often undiagnosed.

On 28 May 2013, it was reported that a cure had been developed via a 3D printed windpipe. This cure has currently saved the lives of at least 3 infants.

== See also ==
- Bronchomalacia
- Tracheomalacia
