= Thyroid artery =

Thyroid artery can refer to:

- the Inferior thyroid artery
- the Superior thyroid artery
- the Thyroid ima artery
