= Aortic sac =

Structure in embryos

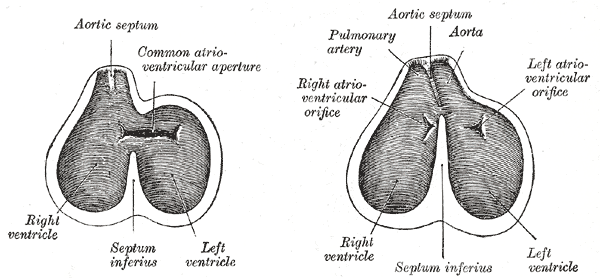
- Diagrams to show the development of the septum of the aortic bulb and of the ventricles.

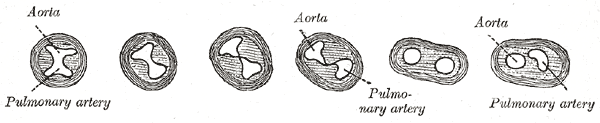
- Transverse sections through the aortic bulb to show the growth of the aortic septum. The lowest section is on the left, the highest on the right of the figure.

Details
- Days: 37
- Precursor: neural crest

Identifiers
- TA98: A12.2.03.004
- TA2: 3992
- TE: sac_by_E4.0.3.5.0.3.12 E4.0.3.5.0.3.12
- FMA: 3740

The aortic sac or aortic bulb is a dilated structure in mammalian embryos, lined by endothelial cells and is the most distal part of the truncus arteriosus. It is the primordial vascular channel from which the aortic arches arise (and eventually the dorsal aortae) and is homologous to the ventral aorta of gill-bearing vertebrates. The aortic sac eventually forms right and left horns, which subsequently give rise to the brachiocephalic trunk and the proximal segment of the arch of aorta, respectively.

Genes HAND2 (dHAND) and HAND1 (eHAND) are expressed during the development of the aortic bulb and the arteries which arise from it. The protein encoded by these genes belong to the basic helix-loop-helix family of transcription factors.
