= Thyroid ima artery =

Artery of the head and neck

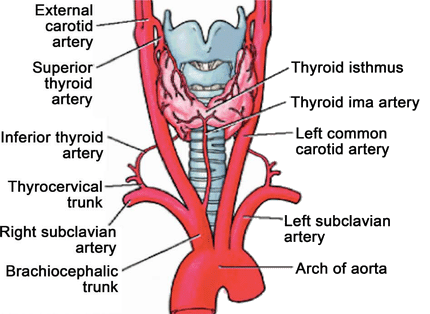
- Location of the artery depicted in the image

Details
- Source: Brachiocephalic artery (most common)
- Supplies: Thyroid gland, trachea, parathyroid glands, thymus gland (as thymica accessoria)

Identifiers
- Latin: arteria thyroidea ima
- TA98: A12.2.04.005
- TA2: 4180
- FMA: 3936

The thyroid ima artery (thyroidea ima artery, arteria thyroidea ima, thyroid artery of Neubauer or the lowest thyroid artery) is an artery of the head and neck. It is an anatomical variant that, when present, supplies blood to the thyroid gland primarily, or the trachea, the parathyroid gland and the thymus gland (as thymica accessoria) in rare cases. It has also been reported to be a compensatory artery when one or both of the inferior thyroid arteries are absent, and in a few cases the only source of blood to the thyroid gland. Furthermore, it varies in origin, size, blood supply, and termination, and occurs in around 3.8% of the population and is 4.5 times more common in fetuses than in adults. Because of the variations and rarity, it may lead to surgical complications, particularly during tracheostomy and other airway managements.

== Structure ==
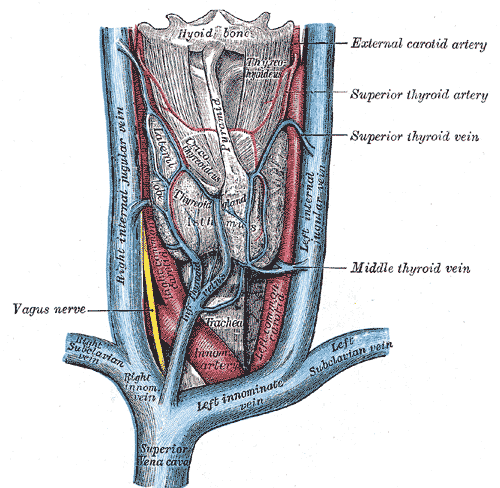
The veins of the thyroid gland (thyroid ima artery not labeled, but region of origin and route are visible)

The thyroid ima artery is an embryonic artery and it occurs because of the failure of the vessel to close, remaining patent (open).

The artery has a variable origin. It mostly arises from the brachiocephalic trunk, but may also originate from the aortic arch, the right common carotid, the subclavian, the pericardiacophrenic artery, the thyrocervical trunk, the transverse scapular or the internal thoracic artery. It ascends in front of the trachea in the superior mediastinum to the lower part of the thyroid gland.

It differs in size and ranges from as small as accessory thyroid arteries to the size of primary thyroid vessels. The diameter of the lumen of the artery ranges from 3 to 5 millimetres (0.12 to 0.20 in). The artery may be present as an accessory thyroid artery, but sometimes appears to compensate for incompetence or absence of one or more main thyroid vessels. Since it begins from below the thyroid gland and ascends upwards, it is mostly associated with absence or reduced size of the inferior thyroid arteries. In such cases, it is known as the accessory inferior thyroid artery. In rare cases, the artery has been seen to be compensating for absence of one or both superior thyroid arteries.

In cases where the length of the thyroid ima artery is shorter, the artery ends by supplying the thymus gland and is known as thymica accessoria.

== Function ==
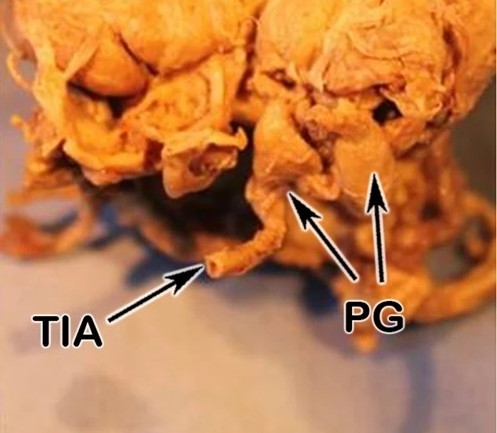
Thyroid ima marked on the image as TIA, parathyroid as PG

When present, the thyroid ima's chief supply is the thyroid gland, though it also supplies the trachea. The artery may extend and supply the parathyroid glands. An infrequently observed artery, it is more frequently reported in the context of enlarged parathyroid glands (parathyroid adenomas). The artery ends by supplying the thyroid gland, or the parathyroid glands, as a single unit or as multiple branches. The artery is also found to be the only supply of the parathyroid gland in rare cases.

== Clinical significance ==
The artery is only present in approximately 3–10% of the population. Thyroid ima artery is of surgical importance; due to its relatively small size and infrequent presence it can cause complications such as severe bleeding. Knowledge of occurrence of the artery is especially important during tracheostomy, sternotomy and thyroidectomy. Because the artery is smaller than the other thyroid vessels, and having an origin from one of the bigger vessels, a brisk cut while performing the surgery may cause complications such as severe hemorrhage and significant blood loss. The artery, if dissected, may draw back into the mediastinum and further complicate the condition by causing hemorrhage and clots in the thoracic cavity.

== History ==
The thyroid ima artery was first defined by German anatomist Johann Ernst Neubauer in the year 1772. Hence, it was named the thyroid artery of Neubauer. The artery originates lower than the inferior thyroid arteries, so it is also known as the lowest thyroid artery. Arteria thyroidea ima is the Latin name of the artery.

== Other animals ==
The presence of thyroid ima artery is also observed in other higher primates. The artery has been reported in gorillas, gibbons, macaques and gray langurs. Variations in the origin were also seen; it was found to originate from the aorta in the thorax, or the carotid in the neck.
