= Bronchomalacia =

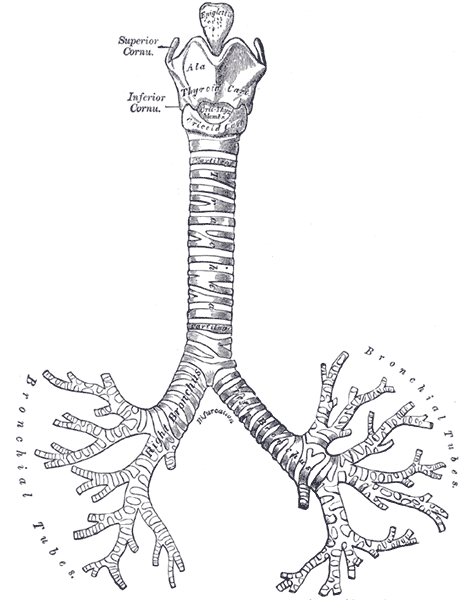
- Larynx, trachea and bronchi.
- Specialty: Respirology

Bronchomalacia is a term for weak cartilage in the walls of the bronchial tubes, often occurring in children. Bronchomalacia means 'floppiness' of some part of the bronchi. Patients present with noisy breathing and/or wheezing. There is collapse of a main stem bronchus on exhalation. If the trachea is also involved the term tracheobronchomalacia (TBM) is used. If only the upper airway the trachea is involved it is called tracheomalacia (TM). There are two types of bronchomalacia. Primary bronchomalacia is due to a deficiency in the cartilaginous rings. Secondary bronchomalacia may occur by extrinsic compression from an enlarged vessel, a vascular ring or a bronchogenic cyst. Though uncommon, idiopathic (of unknown cause) tracheobronchomalacia has been described in older adults.

== Cause ==
Bronchomalacia can best be described as a birth defect of the bronchus in the respiratory tract. Congenital malacia of the large airways is one of the few causes of irreversible airways obstruction in children, with symptoms varying from recurrent wheeze and recurrent lower airways infections to severe dyspnea and respiratory insufficiency. It may also be acquired later in life due to chronic or recurring inflammation resulting from infection or other airway disease.

== Diagnosis ==
=== Classification ===
- Primary Bronchomalacia
- Secondary Bronchomalacia

=== Primary bronchomalacia ===
- Primary Bronchomalacia is classified as congenital.
- Primary Bronchomalacia is caused by a deficiency in the cartilaginous rings.
- Primary airway malacia was defined as airway malacia in otherwise normal infants.

=== Secondary bronchomalacia ===
- Secondary Bronchomalacia is acquired.
- Secondary Bronchomalacia may occur by extrinsic compression from an enlarged vessel, a vascular ring or a bronchogenic cyst.
- Secondary airway malacia was defined as airway malacia secondary to esophageal atresia, VATER/VACTERL association (condition with vertebral anomalies, anal atresia, congenital heart disease, tracheoesophageal fistula or esophageal atresia, renourinary anomalies, or radial limb defects), vascular or other external compression of the airways, or specific syndromes.

== Treatment ==
1. Time
  1. Minimally Invasive, usually in conjunction with Continuous Positive Airflow Pressure.
2. Continuous Positive Airflow Pressure
  1. A method of respiratory ventilation.
3. Tracheotomy
  1. Surgical procedures on the neck to open a direct airway through an incision in the trachea (the windpipe).
4. Prosthesis
  1. Insertion of a prosthesis to keep the bronchial tube open.
