= Stridor =

High-pitched breathing sound due to obstruction of the larynx

- Inspiratory and expiratory stridor in a 13-month child with croup, recorded via electronic stethoscope
- Specialty: Otorhinolaryngology, pediatrics

Stridor (from Latin stridere 'to grate, screech') is an extra-thoracic high-pitched breath sound resulting from turbulent air flow in the larynx or elsewhere in the upper respiratory tract. It is different from stertor, which is a snoring noise originating in the pharynx, and wheezing, which originates in the bronchi.

Stridor is a physical sign which is caused by a narrowed or obstructed airway. It can be inspiratory, expiratory or biphasic, although it is usually heard during inspiration. Inspiratory stridor often occurs in children with croup. It may be indicative of serious airway obstruction from severe conditions such as epiglottitis, a foreign body lodged in the airway, or a laryngeal tumor. Stridor should always command attention to establish its cause. Visualization of the airway by medical experts equipped to control the airway may be needed.

== Causes ==
Stridor may occur as a result of:

- foreign bodies (e.g., aspirated foreign body, aspirated food bolus);
- infections (e.g., epiglottitis, retropharyngeal abscess, croup);
- subglottic stenosis (e.g., following prolonged intubation or congenital);
- airway edema (e.g., following instrumentation of the airway, tracheal intubation, drug side effect, allergic reaction);
- laryngospasm (from aspiration, GERD, or complication of anesthesia);
- subglottic hemangioma (rare);
- vascular rings compressing the trachea;
- thyroiditis such as Riedel's thyroiditis;
- vocal cord palsy;
- tracheomalacia or tracheobronchomalacia (e.g., collapsed trachea);
- congenital anomalies of the airway, present in 87% of all cases of stridor in infants and children;
- vasculitis;
- infectious mononucleosis;
- peritonsillar abscess;
- laryngeal edema, a common cause of stridor post extubation (occurring from pressure of the endotracheal tube on the mucosa as a result of endotracheal tube that is too large (e.g. pediatrics), cuff over inflation, and prolonged intubation times);
- tumor (e.g., laryngeal papillomatosis, squamous cell carcinoma of larynx, trachea or esophagus);
- ALL (T-cell ALL can present with mediastinal mass that compresses the trachea and causes inspiratory stridor).

== Diagnosis ==
Stridor is mainly diagnosed on the basis of history and physical examination, with a view to revealing the underlying problem or condition.

Chest and neck x-rays, bronchoscopy, CT-scans, and/or MRIs may reveal structural pathology.

Flexible fiberoptic bronchoscopy can also be very helpful, especially in assessing vocal cord function or in looking for signs of compression or infection.

== Treatments ==
The first issue of clinical concern in the setting of stridor is whether or not tracheal intubation or tracheostomy is immediately necessary. A reduction in oxygen saturation is considered a late sign of airway obstruction, particularly in a child with healthy lungs and normal gas exchange. Some patients will need immediate tracheal intubation. If intubation can be delayed for a period, a number of other potential options can be considered, depending on the severity of the situation and other clinical details. These include:

- Expectant management with full monitoring, oxygen by face mask, and positioning the head on the bed for optimum conditions (e.g., 45 - 90 degrees).
- Use of nebulized racemic epinephrine (0.5 to 0.75 ml of 2.25% racemic epinephrine added to 2.5 to 3 ml of normal saline) in cases where airway edema may be the cause of the stridor. (Nebulized Codeine in a dose not exceeding 3 mg/kg may also be used, but not together with racemic adrenaline [because of the risk of ventricular arrhythmias].)
- Use of dexamethasone (Decadron) 4–8 mg IV q 8 - 12 h in cases where airway edema may be the cause of the stridor; note that some time (in the range of hours) may be needed for dexamethasone to work fully.
- Use of inhaled Heliox (70% helium, 30% oxygen); the effect is almost instantaneous. Helium, being a less dense gas than nitrogen, reduces turbulent flow through the airways. Always ensure an open airway.

In obese patients, elevation of the panniculus has shown to relieve symptoms by 80%.
