= Tracheoinnominate fistula =

Tracheoinnominate Fistula
- Other names: Tracheal-innominate artery fistula

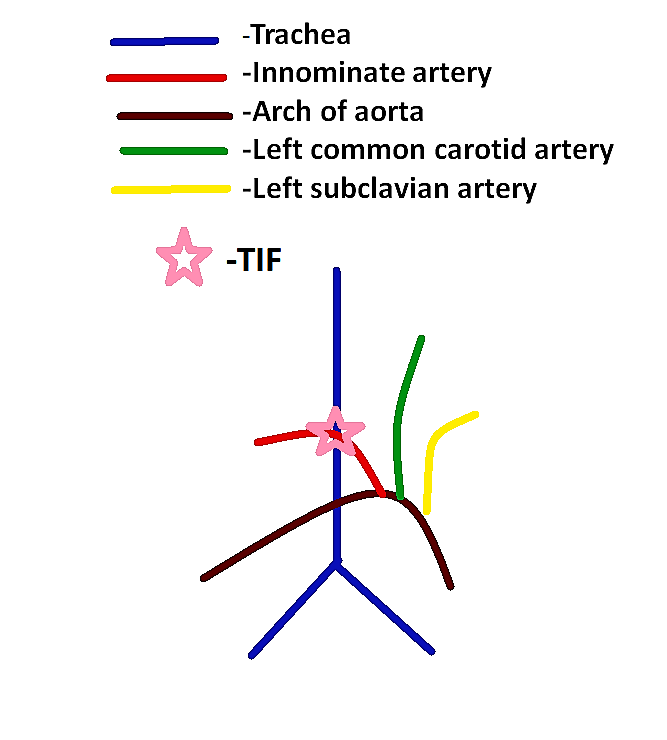
- Depicts the anatomical relationships in the formation of a fistula between the trachea and the innominate artery.
- Specialty: Vascular surgery

Tracheoinnominate fistula (TIAF or TIF) is an abnormal connection (fistula) between the innominate artery (brachiocephalic trunk or brachiocephalic artery) and the trachea. A TIF is a rare but life-threatening iatrogenic injury, usually the sequela of a tracheotomy.

== Signs and symptoms ==
Symptoms include hemoptysis, and/or massive hemorrhage which result from the formation of a fistula between the trachea and the brachiocephalic artery. The primary threat is respiratory compromise leading to dyspnea and cyanosis. Patients can later present with hypovolemic shock which include symptoms of tachycardia, cyanosis, cold and clammy skin, dizziness, confusion, and fatigue. Patients may also develop sepsis.

== Causes ==
The innominate artery usually crosses the trachea at the ninth cartilage ring, however this can vary from the sixth to the thirteenth cartilage ring in patients. A TIF runs between the trachea and the innominate artery. Through this connection blood from within the artery may pass into the trachea or alternatively air from within the trachea may cross into the artery.

TIF is a late complication of a tracheotomy and is associated with prolonged endotracheal intubation, as a result of cuff over inflation or a poorly positioned tracheostomy tube. Over inflation of the cuff causes the tracheostomy tube to erode into the posterior aspect of the innominate artery leading to the formation of a fistula. The pathogenesis of an TIF by the aforementioned method is pressure necrosis by tracheostomy tube on the tracheal wall. An TIF can also occur due to innominate artery injury as a result of an bronchoscopy.

Patients whose tracheotomies are placed beneath the third tracheal ring cartilage and patients with innominate arteries crossing higher on the trachea have an increased risk of developing an TIF. Other factors contributing to the development of TIF include steroids, which weaken the endotracheal mucosa, episodes of hypotension in which the pressure in the tracheostomy tube exceeds that of the endotracheal mucosa, and radiation therapy.

An endotracheal tumor can mimic a TIF and present with massive bleeding during a rigid bronchoscopy.

== Diagnosis ==
Two-thirds of TIF occurs within three weeks of a tracheotomy. A TIF should be on the top of the differential diagnosis in patients with a tracheostomy followed by bleeding. Most effective diagnostic tool is a rigid bronchoscopy, although this may be unnecessary as a massive arterial hemorrhage from the tracheostomy likely indicates the formation of an TIF. However, a rigid brochoscopy can clear the tracheobronchial tree of aspirated blood and may be used to terminate blood flow.

Only 35% of TIF patients exhibit the pathognomonic warning signs which include sentinel bleeding, a small bleed from the tracheostomy in the preceding the TIF, and pulsations of the tracheostomy tube that coincides with the heartbeat.

== Prevention ==
To prevent an TIF, intubation time should be limited to less than 2 weeks and proper techniques should be used when performing tracheotomies. The occurrence of an TIF can be reduced by using more flexible and blunt tracheostomy tubes and insuring that the tubes are properly aligned in the patients. Placing the tracheostomy between the second and third tracheal rings can minimize the risk of an TIF. Repetitive head movements, especially, hyperextension of the neck should be avoided as since this movement results in contact between the innominate artery and the underside of the tube.

== Treatment ==
The formation of a TIF is a medical emergency and requires immediate intervention. Blood volume control, management of the hemorrhage, and adequate oxygenation should be ensured in these patients. In a majority of TIF cases (85%), hyperinflation of the tracheostomy cuff will control the bleeding, while the patient is prepared for surgery. However, if this fails the tracheostomy cuff must be removed, and the patient must be intubated from above. Next, pressure from the index finger can be applied on the bleeding site from within the tracheostomy to control the bleeding. In addition, the "Utley Maneuver", which involves digital compression of the artery against the posterior wall of the manubrium of the sternum following a right infraclavicular incision, may be used to urgently control the bleeding When the bleeding is controlled the patient should be immediately transferred on the operating room.

=== Surgery ===
A sternal saw and a rigid bronchoscopy is used during the operation. During the operation, a median sternotomy is performed in order to expose and ligate the involved artery above and below the fistula. Division of the thymus and superior retraction of the innominate vein exposes the innominate artery. The innominate artery should be debrided to healthy tissue and closed with a monofilament suture. Next, the damaged segments of the trachea and the artery should be excised followed by reconstruction with a primary end to end anastomosis of the trachea. Innominate artery ligation leaves the carotid and subclavian circulations intact. Pulsatile back-bleeding from distal innominate artery stump should be checked to insure collateral circulation. In patients with poor pulsatile back-bleeding, an aorta-axillary artery bypass graft can be considered in patients with severe occlusion of the left common carotid artery, severe atherosclerosis, and brain ischemic or hemorrhagic insults. In addition, an autologous vein bypass between the aorta and the carotid artery or the opposite carotid artery and the subclavian artery may be performed to restore normal circulation. The interposition of viable tissue facilitates tracheal wall repair. Thus, vascularized tissues such as the thymus, strap muscles, the sternocleidomastoid, or the pectoralis major muscle should be interposed between tracheal defect and the vessel stumps to prevent bleeding, seal the mediastinum, fill dead space, cover major vital structures, provide a blood supply and venous drainage, and increase the concentration of antibiotics.

Innominate artery ligation has a 10% risk of neurological deficit.

== Prognosis ==
TIF is a rare condition with a .7% frequency, and a mortality rate approaching 100% without surgical intervention. Immediate diagnosis and intervention of an TIF is critical for the surgical intervention success. 25-30% of TIF patients who reach the operating room survive. Recently, the incidence of TIF may have declined due to advances in tracheostomy tube technology and the introduction of the bedside percutaneous dilatational tracheostomy (PDT).
