= Mario Zaritzky =

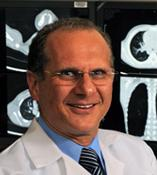
Zaritzky

Mario Zaritzky (born December 16, 1956, in La Plata, Argentina) is MD, scientist and inventor and currently lives and works as an associate professor of Radiology at Jackson Memorial Center. Previously, he was an assistant professor in the Department of Pediatric Radiology Department of Radiology, University of Chicago in Chicago, Illinois, USA. Zaritzky coordinated the Argentine Network of Science in Midwestern, United States, from the Ministry of Science, Technology and Productive Innovation Programme of Argentina.

== Training ==
He graduated as a doctor in 1980 at the University of La Plata in Argentina, and obtained certification as a specialist in pediatric surgery in 1987 and Pediatric Radiology, 1998, College of Medicine, Buenos Aires Province, Argentina.

He worked as surgeon and later as medical and interventional radiologist at the Children's Hospital "Sor María Ludovica" of the city of La Plata, from 1980 to 2004. From 2004 to 2006 was instructor in the Department of Radiology at the University of Chicago in Chicago, Illinois. And from 2007 to the present he serves as assistant professor in the same department.

== Medicine with magnets ==
Creator of a method for repairing congenital malformations of the esophagus through magnetos without the traditional use of surgery whose original idea has been characterized as revolutionary.

By this procedure became Annalise Dapo April 2015 in the first patient in the United States have their corrected without Esophageal atresia surgery. Dapo was born with a long gap esophageal atresia, missing a third of her esophagus. This congenital defect is common, occurring in about 1 in 2500 infants. Surgery was the traditional repair mechanism problem, until Zaritzky, developed this method based on magnets.

== Private life ==
He is married and has two children. He currently resides in the City of Miami, United States.

== Publications ==
He has published 14 refereed scientific articles, 13 book chapters, 14 have been invited speaker at over 100 conferences, held 28 oral presentations, posters, and has two patents (use of magnets for the repair of esophageal atresia, US. 7,282,057 B2, October 2007 and US 2013/0226205 A1 August 2013)
