= Aortic arches =

Vascular structures in the embryo

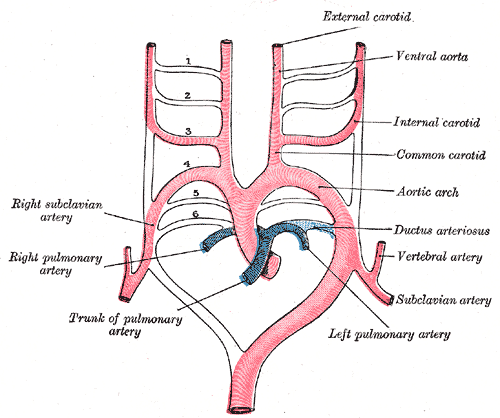
- Scheme of the aortic arches and their destination.

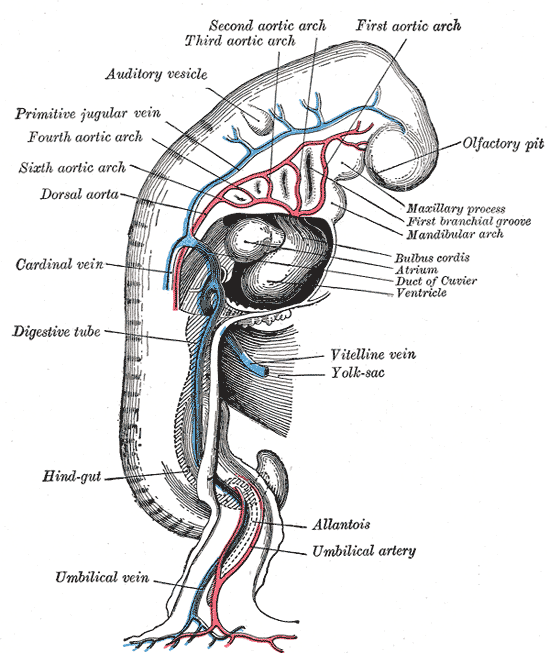
- Profile view of a human embryo estimated at twenty or twenty-one days old.

Details

Identifiers
- Latin: arteriae arcuum pharyngeorum
- TE: arches_by_E4.0.3.5.0.3.3 E4.0.3.5.0.3.3

The aortic arches or pharyngeal arch arteries (previously referred to as branchial arches in human embryos) are a series of six paired embryological vascular structures which give rise to the great arteries of the neck and head. They are ventral to the dorsal aorta and arise from the aortic sac.

The aortic arches are formed sequentially within the pharyngeal arches and initially appear symmetrical on both sides of the embryo, but then undergo a significant remodelling to form the final asymmetrical structure of the great arteries.

== Structure ==
=== Arches 1 and 2 ===
The first and second arches disappear early. A remnant of the 1st arch forms part of the maxillary artery, a branch of the external carotid artery. The ventral end of the second develops into the ascending pharyngeal artery, and its dorsal end gives origin to the stapedial artery, a vessel which typically atrophies in humans but persists in some mammals. The stapedial artery passes through the ring of the stapes and divides into supraorbital (future superior tympanic artery), infraorbital (future anterior tympanic artery), and mandibula branches (future inferior alveolar artery) which follow the three divisions of the trigeminal nerve. A remnant of the second arch also forms the hyoid artery. The infraorbital and mandibular branches arise from a common stem, the terminal part of which anastomoses with the external carotid artery. On the obliteration of the stapedial artery, this anastomosis enlarges and forms the internal maxillary artery; branches formerly of the stapedial artery are subsequently considered branches of the internal maxillary artery. The common stem of the infraorbital and mandibular branches passes between the two roots of the auriculotemporal nerve and becomes the middle meningeal artery; the original supraorbital branch of the stapedial is represented by the orbital twigs of the middle meningeal.

Note that the external carotid buds from the horns of the aortic sac left behind by the regression of the first two arches.

=== Arch 3 ===
The third aortic arch constitutes the commencement of the internal carotid artery, and is therefore named the carotid arch. It contributes to the common carotid arteries bilaterally and the proximal portion of the internal carotid arteries bilaterally.

=== Arch 4 ===
Also known as the systemic arch. The fourth right arch forms the most proximal segment of the right subclavian artery, as far as the origin of its internal thoracic branch. The fourth left arch forms a part of the arch of the aorta, between the origin of the left common carotid and the left subclavian arteries.

=== Arch 5 ===
The fifth arch either never forms or forms incompletely and then regresses.

=== Arch 6 ===
The proximal part of the sixth right arch persists as the proximal part of the right pulmonary artery while the distal section degenerates; The sixth left arch gives off the left pulmonary artery and forms the ductus arteriosus; this duct remains pervious during the whole of fetal life, but then closes within the first few days after birth due to increased O_{2} concentration. Oxygen concentration causes the production of bradykinin which causes the ductus to constrict occluding all flow. Within 1–3 months, the ductus is obliterated and becomes the ligamentum arteriosum.

The ductus arteriosus connects at a junction point that has a low pressure zone (commonly called Bernoulli's principle) created by the inferior curvature (inner radius) of the artery. This low pressure region allows the artery to receive (siphon) the blood flow from the pulmonary artery which is under a higher pressure. However, it is extremely likely that the major force driving flow in this artery is the markedly different arterial pressures in the pulmonary and systemic circulations due to the different arteriolar resistances.

His showed that in the early embryo the right and left arches each gives a branch to the lungs, but that later both pulmonary arteries take origin from the left arch.

== Clinical significance ==
Most defects of the great arteries arise as a result of persistence of aortic arches that normally should regress or regression of arches that normally should not.

- Aberrant subclavian artery; with regression of the right aortic arch 4 and the right dorsal aorta, the right subclavian artery has an abnormal origin on the left side, just below the left subclavian artery. To supply blood to the right arm, this forces the right subclavian artery to cross the midline behind the trachea and esophagus, which may constrict these organs, although usually with no clinical symptoms.
- A double aortic arch; occurs with the development of an abnormal right aortic arch in addition to the left aortic arch, forming a vascular ring around the trachea and esophagus, which usually causes difficulty breathing and swallowing. Occasionally, the entire right dorsal aorta abnormally persists and the left dorsal aorta regresses in which case the right aorta will have to arch across from the esophagus causing difficulty breathing or swallowing.
- Right-sided aortic arch
- Patent ductus arteriosus
- Coarctation of the aorta

== Additional images ==
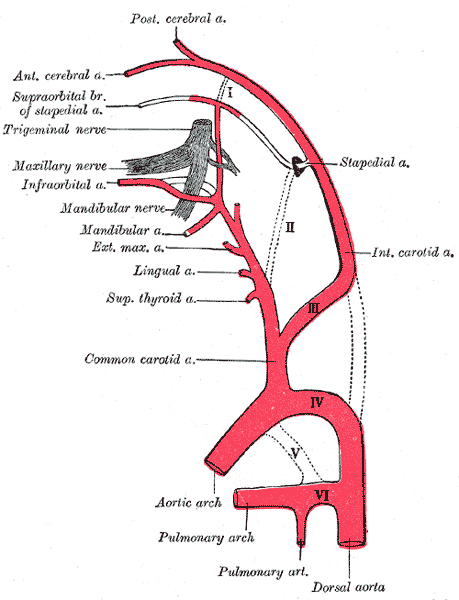
Diagram showing the origins of the main branches of the carotid arteries.

== See also ==
- Pharyngeal arches
