= Vascular ring =

- Specialty: Vascular system

A vascular ring is a congenital defect in which there is an abnormal formation of the aorta and/or its surrounding blood vessels. The trachea and esophagus are completely encircled and sometimes compressed by a "ring" formed by these vessels, which can lead to breathing and digestive difficulties.

Most often this is because of persistence of the double aortic arch after the second month of fetal life.

== Presentation ==
The two arches surround the esophagus and trachea which, if sufficiently constrictive, may cause breathing or swallowing difficulties despite medical therapies.

A less common ring is present with a right aortic arch instead of the usual left-sided aortic arch. This compresses the esophagus and trachea because of the persistence of a ductal ligament (from fetal circulation) that may connect between the aorta on the front and the left subclavian artery posteriorly going to the left arm.

Patients with double aortic arch often present in early infancy, whereas partial or incomplete vascular rings can go asymptomatic until adulthood.

== Symptoms ==
The severity of symptoms is dependent on the degree of compression imposed on the trachea and esophagus, with a greater degree of compression resulting in more severe symptoms. Symptoms are primarily respiratory in nature (90%), however gastrointestinal symptoms are also common (40%).

Respiratory symptoms may include difficulty breathing, chronic cough, stridor and recurrent respiratory tract infections. Respiratory arrest may also occur. The cough caused by vascular rings has been described as a "seal-bark" cough, similar in nature to the barking cough of croup.

Dysphagia is the most common gastrointestinal symptom, however in many cases only subtle gastrointestinal symptoms may be present. These include slow feeding and a hyperextension of the head whilst eating.

== Diagnosis ==
Infants with vascular rings typically present before 12 months with respiratory or esophageal symptoms like stridor, wheezing, cough, dysphagia, or difficulty feeding. The stridor improves with neck extension, differentiating from laryngomalacia which is relieved by prone or upright positioning, and will not be relieved with corticosteroids or epinephrine, unlike croup. Diagnosis requires a high degree of clinical suspicion and can be confirmed with barium contrast esophagogram for those with esophageal symptoms, bronchoscopy, or CT or MRI.

== Treatment ==
Most cases are treated surgically, though the procedure is highly dependent on the specific vascular abnormality. In cases of where the brachiocephalic artery is responsible for tracheal compression, surgery is considered unnecessary in the majority of cases.
