= Myelomalacia =

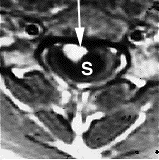
- MRI image shows spinal bleeding (myelomalacia).

Myelomalacia is a pathological term referring to the softening of the spinal cord. Possible causes of myelomalacia include cervical myelopathy, hemorrhagic infarction, or acute injury, such as that caused by intervertebral disc extrusion.

In advanced stages, this disorder causes flaccid paraplegia (impairment of motor function in lower extremities), total areflexia (below normal or absence of reflexes) of the pelvic limbs and anus, loss of deep pain perception caudal (toward the coccyx, or tail) to the site of spinal cord injury, muscular atrophy (wasting away of muscle tissue), depressed mental state, and respiratory difficulty due to intercostal (muscles that run between the ribs) and diaphragmatic paralysis. Gradual cranial migration of the neurological deficits (problems relating to the nervous system), is known as ascending syndrome and is said to be a typical feature of diffuse myelomalacia. Although clinical signs of myelomalacia are observed within the onset (start) of paraplegia, sometimes they may become evident only in the post-operative period, or even days after the onset of paraplegia. Death from myelomalacia may occur as a result of respiratory paralysis when the ascending lesion (abnormal damaged tissue) reaches the motor nuclei of the phrenic nerves (nerves between the C3-C5 region of the spine) in the cervical (neck) region.

== Classification ==
Myelomalacia affects the neurological functions in the spinal cord. Once breached, the ramification of the damage directly affects the motor functions of the body. Because the central nervous system is affected, the condition is classified under the neurological field of study.

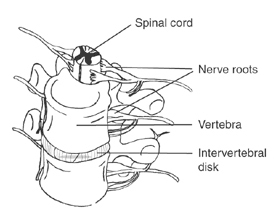
The spine shown here with spinal cord.

=== Spinal cord injury ===
When myelomalacia occurs, the damage done to the spinal cord may range from minimal to extensive. The spinal cord and the brain work together, making them the key components of the central nervous system. Damage to this system affects specific functions of the body, primarily relating to the function of muscles. The areas most commonly injured include the cervical vertebrae (C1-C7), and the lumbar spine (L1-L5).

== Symptoms ==
Depending on the extent of the spinal cord injury, the symptoms may vary. Though every case is different, several cases reported loss of motor functions in the extremities, areflexia or sudden jerks of the limbs, loss of pain perception, or even paralysis; all of which are possible indicators of a damaged and softened spinal cord. In the most severe cases, paralysis of the respiratory system manifests in death.

== Cause ==
The most common way the disorder occurs is from a result of hemorrhaging (bleeding within) or inadequate blood supply to the spinal cord, making it weak and susceptible to damage.

Because myelomalacia involves a damaged spinal cord, it may occur in any individual. Those most at risk are the geriatric population due to weaker bone density. Once the spinal injury has occurred, one of two things may happen. Firstly, hemorrhaging within the spinal cord may cause compression, which damages the spinal cord even further. Another consequence of myelomalacia is improper circulation of blood to the area damaged, resulting in further damage to the spinal cord.

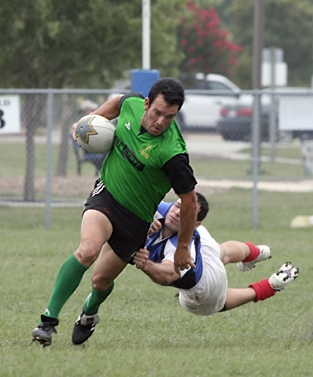
Spinal injuries leading to myelomalacia occur in the world of athletic sports.

=== Athletes ===
Due to extensive physical contact and activity, many athletes become victim to myelomalacia. Any accidents or injuries attained during athletic competition to the spinal cord may result in myelomalacia. Accounts of awkward landing on the ground or being hit intensively have attested to spinal cord injury.

=== Geriatric ===
With the growth in the elderly population of humans, there has been a rise in myelomalacia. Because the human body begins to deteriorate with age, and because people are living longer, there has been a growth in cases of myelomalacia. As the bones in the body begin to weaken in a process known as osteopenia, the body is more vulnerable to damage. A simple fall may damage the spinal cord and myelomalacia may soon ensue.

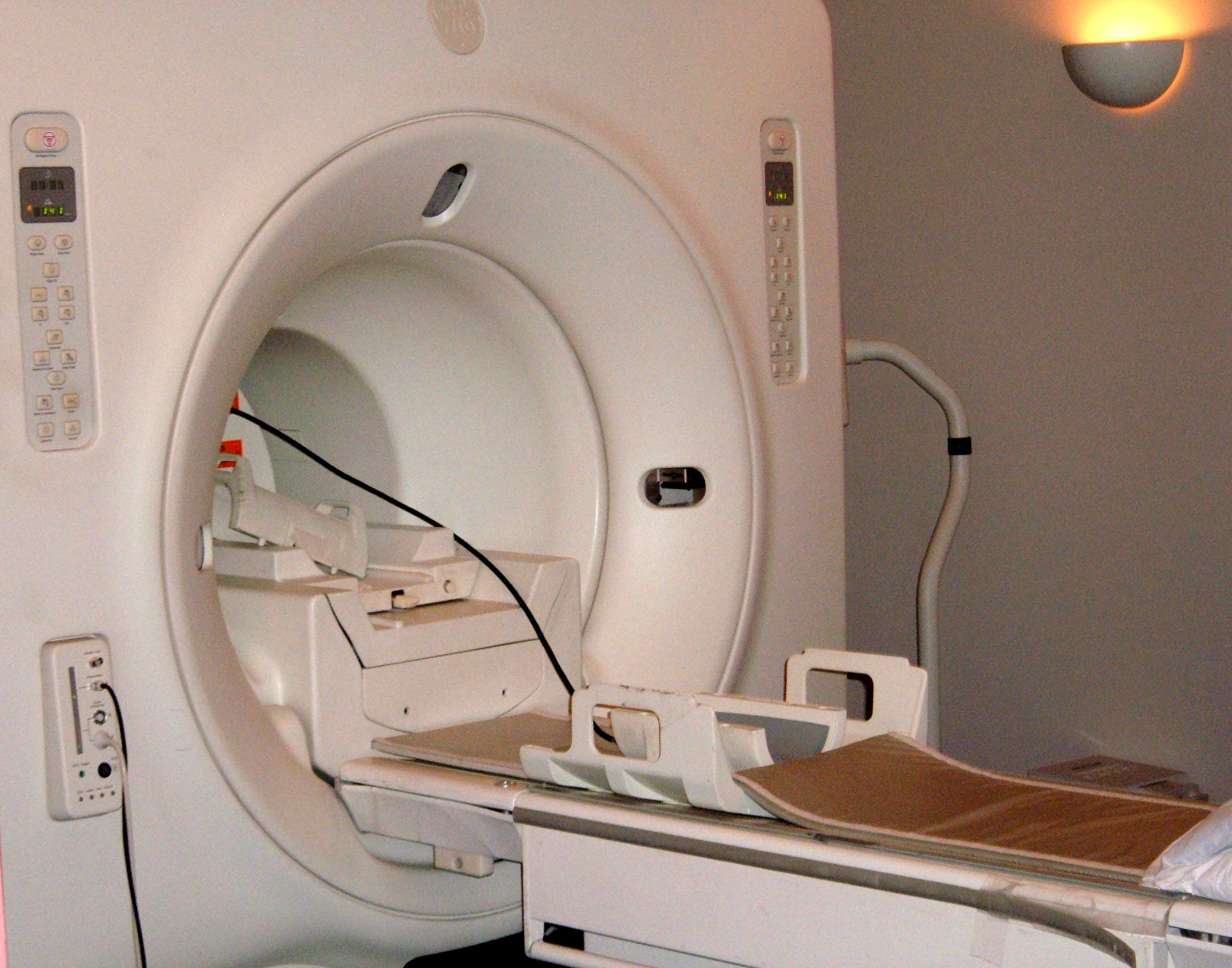
Magnetic resonance imaging (MRI) shown here.

== Diagnosing ==
There are two tests that can provide a definite diagnosis of myelomalacia; magnetic resonance imaging (MRI), or myelography. Diffuse hyperintensity on T2-weighted imaging, and hypointensity on T1-weighted imaging of the spinal cord can be an indication of the onset or progression of myelomalacia

== Treatment ==
There is no known treatment to reverse nerve damage due to myelomalacia. In some cases, surgery to alleviate the injury to the area may slow or stop further damage. As motor function degenerates, muscle spasticity and atrophy may occur. Medications such as NSAIDs and gabapentinoids may be prescribed to reduce swelling of the spinal cord, pain, and spasticity.

Research is underway to consider the potential of stem cells for treatment of neurodegenerative diseases. There are, however, no approved stem cell therapies for myelomalacia.

== See also ==
- Neurology
- Spinal Cord

- Paralysis
- Stem Cell
