= Tracheobronchoplasty =

- Specialty: Otolaryngologist

A tracheobronchoplasty is a surgical procedure performed at limited medical facilities across the United States. It consists of a thoracic surgery during which mesh is sutured to the outside of the patient's trachea through a series of hundreds of knots. These sutures are in turn pulled taught which subsequently 'opens' the collapsed tissue in the tracheal wall creating an opening with which to process air. The hope is eventually, this 'scaffolding' of sorts will scar over thereby strengthening the structure and making it permanent.

Recovery time is typically six to nine months and the patient should see gradual improvement in voice control, reduced coughing and an increased ability to move air more effectively. Not all patients with tracheobronchomalacia can be considered candidates for this procedure. However, it does offer an alternative for those patients who are unable to tolerate the more traditional stent therapy.
