= Laryngomalacia =

Birth defect in which the larynx collapses during inhalation

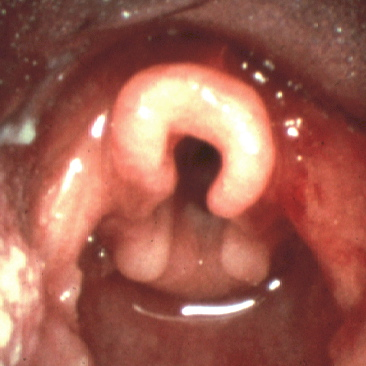
- Omega-shaped epiglottis, seen in laryngomalacia
- Specialty: Otorhinolaryngology

Laryngomalacia (literally, "soft larynx") is the most common cause of chronic stridor in infancy, in which the soft, immature cartilage of the upper larynx collapses inward during inhalation, causing obstruction of the airways. It can also be seen in older patients, especially those with neuromuscular conditions resulting in weakness of the muscles of the throat. However, the infantile form is much more common. Laryngomalacia is one of the most common laryngeal congenital diseases in infancy. Although, most infants have mild symptoms and do not require surgery, those with more severe symptoms including feeding and breathing difficulties may require surgery.

== Anatomy and pathophysiology ==
In infantile laryngomalacia, the supraglottic larynx (the part above the vocal cords) is tightly curled, with a short band holding the cartilage shield in the front (the epiglottis) tightly to the mobile cartilage in the back of the larynx (the arytenoids). These bands are known as the aryepiglottic folds. The shortened aryepiglottic folds cause the epiglottis to be curled on itself. This is the well known "omega shaped" epiglottis in laryngomalacia. Another common finding of laryngomalacia involves the posterior or back part of the larynx, where the arytenoid cartilages or the mucosa/tissue over the arytenoid cartilages can collapse into the airway and cause airway obstruction.

During the normal respiratory cycle, changes to the size of the thoracic cavity results in changes in intrathoracic pressure relative to atmospheric pressure allowing air to move into and out of the lungs. During inspiration, the expanding chest cavity results in a negative intrathoracic pressure that allows air to enter the lungs. During expiration, the collapsing chest cavity results in positive intrathoracic pressure that allows air to exit the lungs. Depending if an obstructing lesion is intrathoracic or extrathoracic, the resulting stridor is more prominent with expiration or inspiration, respectively. Normally, laryngeal structures are rigid once fully developed. However in laryngomalacia, these tissues are "floppy" causing the laryngeal structures to collapse during inspiration due to the negative pressure. This results in inspiratory stridor.

== Etiology ==
Laryngomalacia is the most common cause of stridor in infants, affecting 40-75% of neonates. There are a few suspected etiologies for laryngomalacia however the exact cause is unknown. Contributing factors may include excess tissue, hypotonia or lack of muscle tone, anatomical abnormalities, neurological abnormalities, or inflammation/swelling.

Although laryngomalacia is not associated with a specific gene, there is evidence that some cases may be inherited. Relaxation or a lack of muscle tone in the upper airway may be a factor. It is often worse when the infant is on his or her back, because the floppy tissues can fall over the airway opening more easily in this position.

There are 3 different types of laryngomalacia that have been documented. Type 1 is described as excess mucosal tissue overlying the arytenoid cartilages that protrudes into the glottis, collapsing anteriorly. Type 2 is described as short aryepiglottic folds that collapse medially. Type 3 is described as an elongated epiglottis that collapses posteriorly.

The most common comorbidity is gastroesophageal reflux. Additional comorbidities include swallowing dysfunction and sleep disordered breathing or obstructive sleep apnea.

== Signs and symptoms ==
Laryngomalacia results in partial airway obstruction, most commonly causing a characteristic high-pitched squeaking noise on inhalation (inspiratory stridor). While laryngomalacia most commonly causes inspiratory stridor, biphasic stridor (during inspiration and expiration) can be observed. Inspiratory stridor occurs whenever there is an obstruction above the vocal cords. Biphasic stridor occurs whenever there is an obstruction below the vocal cords. At birth or within the first few days of life, stridor can be observed. Sometimes patients do not display symptoms until 6 weeks of life as inspiratory flow rates are not sufficient to generate sounds. Symptoms typically peak around 6–7 months. For most infants stridor disappears by 12–24 months and does not require treatment.

Stridor can be exacerbated when the infant is lying on its back, during feeding, and during distress. Stridor may also improve when placing infants in the prone position (lying on their stomach) as this pulls the larynx forward relieving the obstruction by making the glottis more patent. Some infants have feeding difficulties related to this problem, including gagging, choking, regurgitation, or vomiting. Some infants can also have breathing difficulties due to the obstruction of the airway. Due to the increased metabolic demand associated with feeding and breathing difficulties, this can lead to weight loss or failure to thrive in some infants. In infants with breathing difficulties, chronic hypoxia can lead to pulmonary hypertension and addition sequela like right heart strain or cor pulmonale. Most infants have mild symptoms. Rarely, children will have significant life-threatening airway obstruction. The vast majority, however, will only have stridor without other more serious symptoms such as dyspnea (difficulty breathing).

== Diagnosis ==
In some cases, diagnosis can be made by history and physical examination by a physician. The physician may recommend a flexible laryngoscopy to further evaluate the infant's condition. A flexible laryngoscopy allow direct visualization of the laryngeal structures during inspiration and expiration. This may reveal collapse of the collapse of the arytenoids or epiglottis during inspiration. The omega shaped epiglottis may be visualized. This procedure may be done while awake or under general anesthesia or sedation. If done on an awake infant this can be completed in an otolaryngology office (Ear, Nose, and Throat physician). It has been found that completing this technique under anesthesia resulted in a sensitivity and specificity of 100%.

Additional testing can be done to confirm the diagnoses including; flexible fiberoptic laryngoscopy, airway fluoroscopy, direct laryngoscopy and bronchoscopy.

== Treatment ==
Time is the only treatment necessary in more than 90% of infant cases. In other cases, surgery may be necessary. Most commonly, this involves cutting the aryepiglottic folds to let the supraglottic airway spring open. Trimming of the arytenoid cartilages or the mucosa/ tissue over the arytenoid cartilages can also be performed as part of the supraglottoplasty. Supraglottoplasty can be performed bilaterally (on both the left and right sides at the same time), or be staged where only one side is operated on at a time. This surgery has a success rate of 94%.

Treatment of gastroesophageal reflux disease can also help in the treatment of laryngomalacia, since gastric contents can cause the back part of the larynx to swell and collapse even further into the airway. In some cases, a temporary tracheostomy may be necessary in more severe cases.

== Prognosis ==
Laryngomalacia becomes symptomatic after the first few months of life (2–3 months), and the stridor may get louder over the first year, as the child moves air more vigorously. Most of the cases resolve spontaneously by 2 years of age and fewer than 10% of the cases will need surgical intervention.
