= Aortopexy =

Surgical procedure

Aortopexy is a surgical procedure in which the aortic arch is fixated to the sternum. It results in the tracheal lumen being pulled open. It is used to treat severe tracheomalacia or tracheal compression.

The procedure was originally proposed as a treatment for tracheomalacia Filler et al. in 1976.
