= Aortic arch =

Part of the aorta

- The aortic arch has three branches, the brachiocephalic trunk, left common carotid artery, and left subclavian artery.

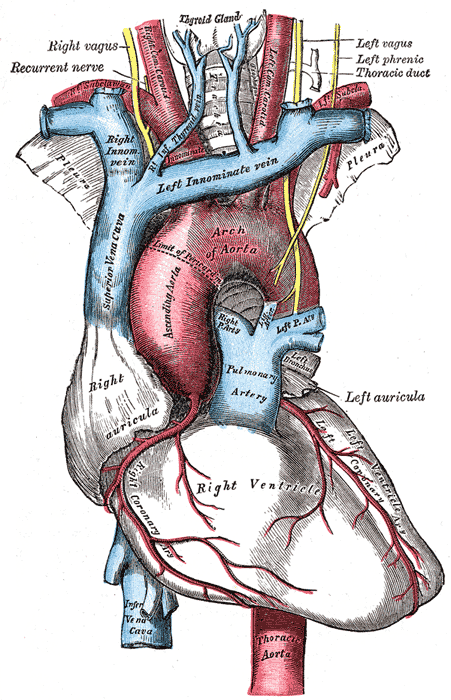
- The aortic arch and its branches shown in situ.

Details
- Precursor: Fourth left pharyngeal arch artery
- Source: Ascending aorta
- Branches: Brachiocephalic trunk; Left common carotid artery; Left subclavian artery; Continues as descending aorta, thoracic part
- Vein: Combination of superior and inferior vena cava
- Supplies: From its branches, the upper body, arms, head and neck. As a part of the aorta, the entire body, with exception of the respiratory zone of the lung and the heart.

Identifiers
- Latin: arcus aortae
- TA98: A12.2.04.001
- TA2: 4177
- FMA: 3768

The aortic arch, arch of the aorta, or transverse aortic arch (English: /eɪˈɔːrtɪk/) is the part of the aorta between the ascending and descending aorta. The arch travels backward, so that it ultimately runs to the left of the trachea.

== Structure ==
The aorta begins at the level of the upper border of the second/third sternocostal articulation of the right side, behind the ventricular outflow tract and pulmonary trunk. The right atrial appendage overlaps it. The first few centimeters of the ascending aorta and pulmonary trunk lies in the same pericardial sheath and runs at first upward, arches over the pulmonary trunk, right pulmonary artery, and right main bronchus to lie behind the right second costal cartilage. The right lung and sternum lies anterior to the aorta at this point. The aorta then passes posteriorly and to the left, anterior to the trachea, and arches over left main bronchus and left pulmonary artery, and reaches to the left side of the T4 vertebral body. Apart from T4 vertebral body, other structures such as trachea, oesophagus, and thoracic duct (from front to back) also lies to the left of the aorta. Inferiorly, the arch of aorta is connected to ligamentum arteriosum while superiorly, it gives rise to three main branches. The arch of aorta continues as the descending aorta after T4 vertebral body.

The aortic arch has three main branches on its superior aspect. The first, and largest, branch of the arch of the aorta is the brachiocephalic trunk, which is to the right and slightly anterior to the other two branches and originates behind the manubrium of the sternum. Next, the left common carotid artery originates from the aortic arch to the left of the brachiocephalic trunk, then ascends along the left side of the trachea and through the superior mediastinum. Finally, the left subclavian artery comes off of the aortic arch to the left of the left common carotid artery and ascends, with the left common carotid, through the superior mediastinum and along the left side of the trachea. An anatomical variation is that the left vertebral artery can arise from the aortic arch instead of the left subclavian artery.

The arch of the aorta forms two curvatures: one with its convexity upward, the other with its convexity forward and to the left. Its upper border is usually about 2.5 cm below the superior border to the manubrium sterni. Blood flows from the upper curvature to the upper regions of the body, located above the heart - namely the arms, neck, and head.

Coming out of the heart, the thoracic aorta has a maximum diameter of 40 mm at the root. By the time it becomes the ascending aorta, the diameter should be <35–38 mm, and 30 mm at the arch. The diameter of the descending aorta should not exceed 25 mm.

The arch of the aorta lies within the mediastinum.

At the cellular level, the aorta and the aortic arch are composed of three layers: The tunica intima, which surrounds the lumen and is composed of simple squamal epithelial cells; the tunica media, composed of smooth cell muscles and elastic fibers; and, the tunica adventitia, composed of loose collagen fibers. Innervated by barometric nerve terminals, the aortic arch is responsible for sensing changes in the dilation of the vascular walls, inducing changes in heart rate to compensate for changes in blood pressure.

=== Development ===
The aortic arch is the connection between the ascending and descending aorta, and its central part is formed by the left 4th aortic arch during early development.

The ductus arteriosus connects to the lower part of the arch in foetal life. This allows blood from the right ventricle to mostly bypass the pulmonary vessels as they develop.

The final section of the aortic arch is known as the aortic isthmus. This is so called because it is a narrowing (isthmus) of the aorta as a result of decreased blood flow when in foetal life. As the left ventricle of the heart increases in size throughout life, the narrowing eventually dilates to become a normal size. If this does not occur, this can result in coarctation of the aorta. The ductus arteriosus connects to the final section of the arch in foetal life. Ductus arteriosus then regresses to become ligamentum arteriosum during later life.

=== Variation ===
There are three common variations in how arteries branch from the aortic arch. In about 75% of individuals, the branching is "normal", as described above. In some individuals the left common carotid artery originates from the brachiocephalic artery rather than the aortic arch. In others, the brachiocephalic artery and left common carotid artery share an origin. This variant is found in approximately a 20% of the population. In a third variant, the brachiocephalic artery splits into three arteries: the left common carotid artery, the right common carotid artery and the right subclavian artery; this variant is found in an estimated 7% of individuals. In rare cases, the thyroid ima artery, a variant artery supplying the thyroid gland may arise from the aortic arch.

== Clinical significance ==
The aortic knob is the prominent shadow of the aortic arch on a frontal chest radiograph.

Aortopexy is a surgical procedure in which the aortic arch is fixed to the sternum in order to keep the trachea open.

Aortic isthmus is the relatively fixed part of the aortic arch. It is prone to shearing force and trauma that can cause it to tear and result in massive bleeding.

== Additional images ==
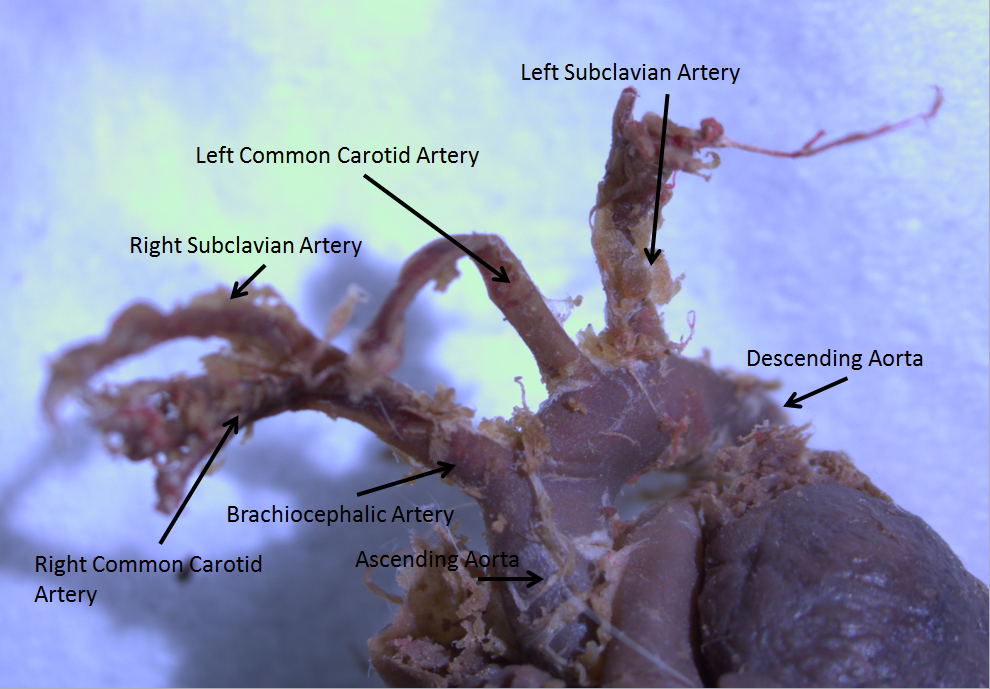
Murine model aortic arch and branches of aorta in species Rattus rattus

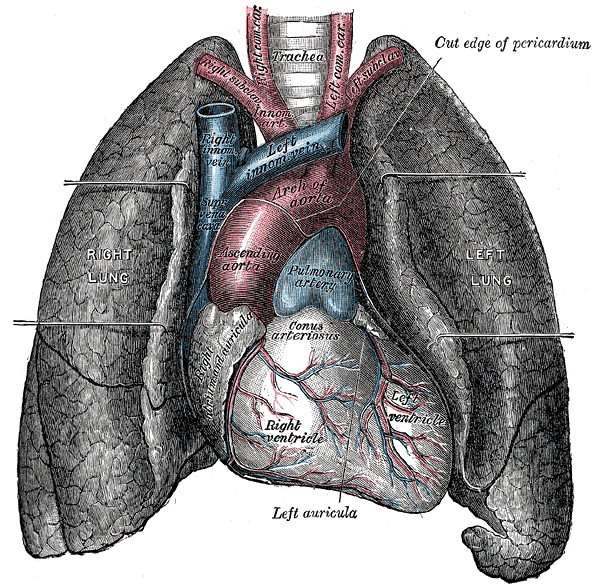
The arch of aorta can be seen here, with the lungs to either side and emerging from the heart, below.

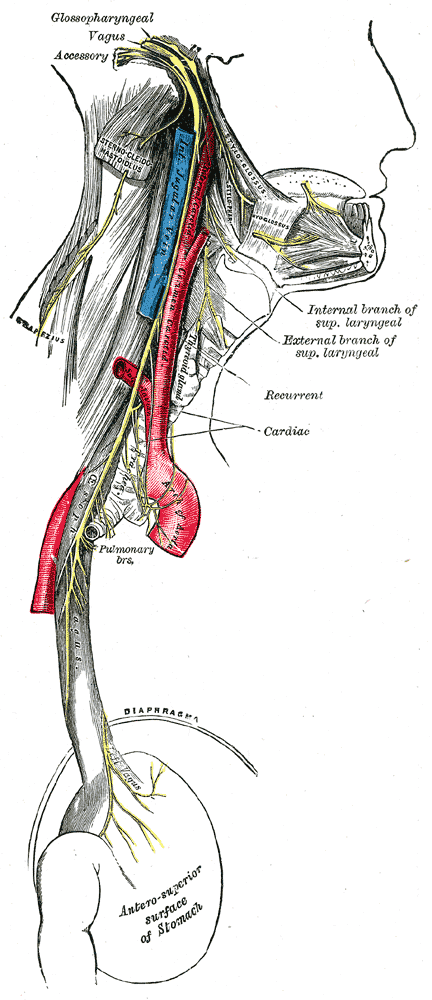
A branch of the vagus nerve, the recurrent laryngeal nerve, passes underneath the arch of aorta. The nerve is seen here.
