= Tracheotomy =

Temporary surgical incision to create an airway into the trachea

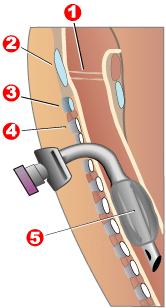
- Completed tracheotomy: 1 – Vocal folds 2 – Thyroid cartilage 3 – Cricoid cartilage 4 – Tracheal rings 5 – Balloon cuff
- ICD-10-PCS: 0B110F4
- ICD-9-CM: 31.1
- MeSH: D014140
- MedlinePlus: 002955

Tracheotomy (/ˌtreɪkiˈɒtəmi/, UK also /ˌtræki-/), or tracheostomy, is a surgical airway management procedure which consists of making an incision on the front of the neck to open a direct airway to the trachea. The resulting stoma (hole) can serve independently as an airway or as a site for a tracheal tube (or tracheostomy tube) to be inserted; this tube allows a person to breathe without the use of the nose or mouth.

== Etymology and terminology ==
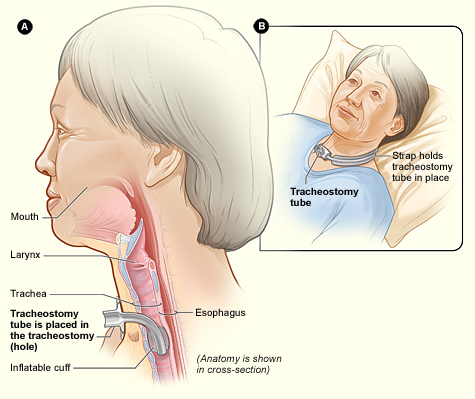
Figure A shows a side view of the neck and the correct placement of a tracheostomy tube in the trachea, or windpipe. Figure B shows an external view of a patient who has a tracheostomy.

The etymology of the word tracheotomy comes from two Greek words: the root tom- (from Greek τομή tomḗ) meaning "to cut", and the word trachea (from Greek τραχεία tracheía). The word tracheostomy, including the root stom- (from Greek στόμα stóma) meaning "mouth", refers to the making of a semi-permanent or permanent opening and to the opening itself. Some sources offer different definitions of the above terms. Part of the ambiguity is due to the uncertainty of the intended permanence of the stoma (hole) at the time it is created.

== Indications ==
There are four main reasons why someone would receive a tracheotomy:

1. Emergency airway access
2. Airway access for prolonged mechanical ventilation
3. Functional or mechanical upper airway obstruction
4. Decreased/incompetent clearance of tracheobronchial secretions

In the acute (short term) setting, indications for tracheotomy include such conditions as severe facial trauma, tumors of the head and neck (e.g., cancers, branchial cleft cysts), and acute angioedema (swelling) and inflammation of the head and neck. In the context of failed tracheal intubation, either tracheotomy or cricothyrotomy may be performed.

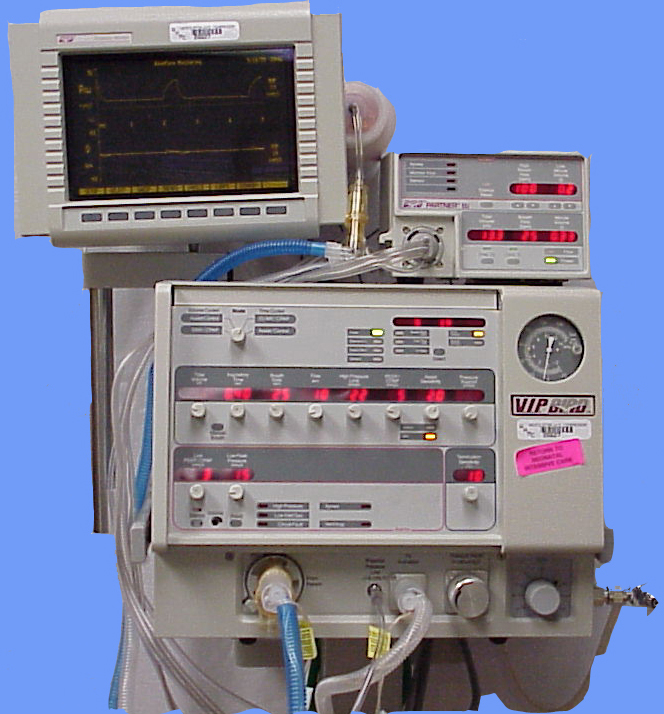
Tracheotomy tubes and endotracheal tubes are often attached to ventilators to assist in breathing.

In the chronic (long-term) setting, indications for tracheotomy include the need for long-term mechanical ventilation and tracheal toilet (e.g., comatose patients, extensive surgery involving the head and neck). Tracheotomy may result in a significant reduction in the administration of sedatives and vasopressors, as well as the duration of stay in the intensive care unit (ICU).

In extreme cases, the procedure may be indicated as a treatment for severe obstructive sleep apnea (OSA) seen in patients intolerant of continuous positive airway pressure (CPAP) therapy. The reason tracheostomy works well for OSA is that it is the only surgical procedure that completely bypasses the upper airway. This procedure was commonly performed for obstructive sleep apnea until the 1980s, when other procedures such as the uvulopalatopharyngoplasty, genioglossus advancement, and maxillomandibular advancement surgeries were described as alternative surgical modalities for OSA.

If prolonged ventilation is required, tracheostomy is usually considered. The timing of this procedure is dependent on the clinical situation and an individual's preference. An international multicenter study in 2000 determined that the median time between starting mechanical ventilation and receiving a tracheostomy was 11 days. Although the definition varies depending on hospital and provider, early tracheostomy can be considered to be less than 10 days (2 to 14 days) and late tracheostomy to be 10 days or more.

== Alternatives ==
Biphasic cuirass ventilation is a form of non-invasive mechanical ventilation that can — in a small subset of cases — allow people to avoid a tracheostomy.

== Components ==
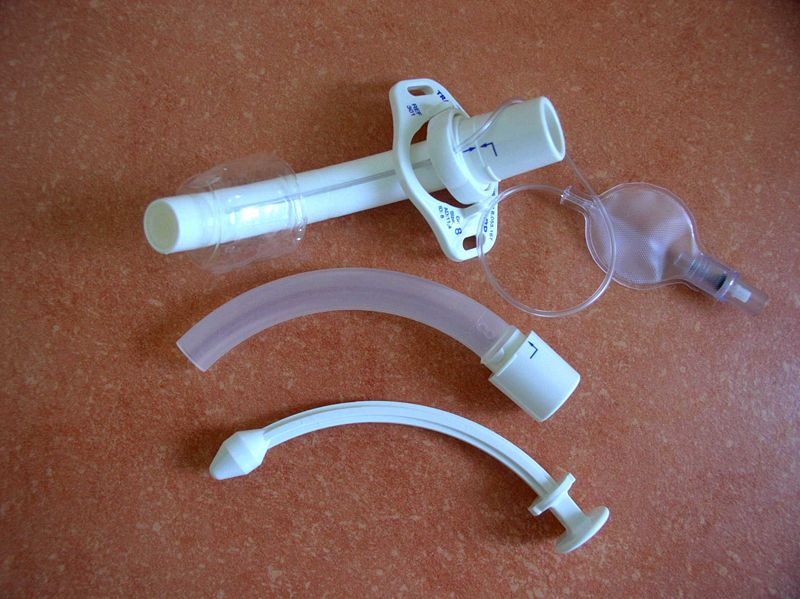
An outer cannula (top item) with inflatable cuff (top right), an inner cannula (center item) and an obturator (bottom item)

A tracheostomy tube may be single or dual lumen, and also cuffed or uncuffed. A dual lumen tracheostomy tube consists of an outer cannula or main shaft, an inner cannula, and an obturator. The obturator is used when inserting the tracheostomy tube to guide the placement of the outer cannula and is removed once the outer cannula is in place. The outer cannula remains in place but, because of the buildup of secretions, there is an inner cannula that may be removed for cleaning after use or it may be replaced. Single-lumen tracheostomy tubes do not have a removable inner cannula, suitable for narrower airways. Cuffed tracheostomy tubes have inflatable balloons at the end of the tube to secure them in place. A tracheostomy tube may be fenestrated with one or several holes to let air through the larynx, allowing speech.

Special tracheostomy tube valves (such as the Passy-Muir valve) have been created to assist people in their speech. The patient can inhale through the unidirectional tube. Upon expiration, pressure causes the valve to close, redirecting air around the tube, past the vocal folds, producing sound.

== Surgical procedure ==
=== Open surgical tracheotomy (OST) ===
The typical procedure done is the open surgical tracheotomy (OST) and is usually done in a sterile operating room. The optimal patient position involves a cushion under the shoulders to extend the neck. Commonly a transverse (horizontal) incision is made two fingerbreadths above the suprasternal notch. Alternatively, a vertical incision can be made in the midline of the neck from the thyroid cartilage to just above the suprasternal notch. Skin, subcutaneous tissue, and strap muscles (a specific group of neck muscles) are retracted aside to expose the thyroid isthmus, which can be cut or retracted upwards. After proper identification of the cricoid cartilage and placement of a tracheal hook to steady the trachea and pull it forward, the trachea is cut open, either through the space between cartilage rings or vertically across multiple rings (cruciate incision). Occasionally a section of a tracheal cartilage ring may be removed to make insertion of the tube easier. Once the incision is made, a properly sized tube is inserted. The tube is connected to a ventilator and adequate ventilation and oxygenation is confirmed. The tracheotomy apparatus is then attached to the neck with tracheotomy ties, skin sutures, or both.

=== Percutaneous dilatational tracheotomy (PDT) ===
The first widely accepted percutaneous tracheotomy technique was described by Pat Ciaglia, a New York surgeon, in 1985. The next widely used technique was developed in 1989 by Bill Griggs, an Australian intensive care specialist. In 1995, Fantoni developed a translaryngeal approach of percutaneous tracheostomy. The Griggs and Ciaglia Blue Rhino techniques are the two main techniques in current use. A number of comparison studies have been undertaken between these two techniques with no clear differences emerging. An advantage of PDT over OST is the ability to perform the procedure at the patient's bedside. This significantly decreases costs and time/people-power needed for an operating room (OR) procedure. Contraindications for percutaneous tracheostomy include infection at the site of tracheostomy, uncontrolled bleeding disorder, unstable cardiopulmonary status, patient unable to stay still, abnormal anatomy of the tracheolaryngeal structures.

== Risks and complications ==
As with most other surgical procedures, some cases are more difficult than others. Surgery on children is more difficult because of their smaller size. Difficulties such as a short neck and bigger thyroid glands make the trachea hard to open. There are other difficulties with patients with irregular necks, the obese, and those with a large goitre.

The many possible complications include hemorrhage, loss of airway, subcutaneous emphysema, wound infections, stoma cellulites, fracture of tracheal rings, poor placement of the tracheostomy tube, and bronchospasm.

Early complications include infection, hemorrhage, pneumomediastinum, pneumothorax, tracheoesophageal fistula, recurrent laryngeal nerve injury, and tube displacement. Delayed complications include tracheal-innominate artery fistula, tracheal stenosis, delayed tracheoesophageal fistula, and tracheocutaneous fistula.

A 2013 systematic review (published cases from 1985 to April 2013) studied the complications and risk factors of percutaneous dilatational tracheostomy (PDT), identifying major causes of fatality to be hemorrhage (38.0%), airway complications (29.6%), tracheal perforation (15.5%), and pneumothorax (5.6%) A similar systematic review in 2017 (cases from 1990 to 2015) studying fatality in both open surgical tracheotomy (OST) and PDT identified similar rates of mortality and causes of death between the two techniques.

Hemorrhage is rare, but the most likely cause of fatality after a tracheostomy. It usually occurs due to a tracheoarterial fistula, an abnormal connection between the trachea and nearby blood vessels, and most commonly manifests between 3 days to 6 weeks after the procedure is done. Fistulas can result from incorrectly positioned equipment, high cuff pressures causing pressure sores or mucosal damage, a low surgical trachea site, repetitive neck movement, radiotherapy, or prolonged intubation.

A potential risk factor identified in a 2013 systematic review of the percutaneous technique was the lack of bronchoscopic guidance. Use of the bronchoscope, an instrument inserted through a patient's mouth for internal visualization of the airway, can help with proper placement of instruments and better visualization of anatomical structures. However, this can also be dependent on the skills and familiarity of the surgeon with both the procedure and the patient's anatomy.

There are a multitude of potential complications related to the airway. The main causes of mortality during PDT include dislodgment of the tube, loss of airway during procedure and misplacement of the tube. One of the more urgent complications include displacement or dislodgment of the tracheotomy tube, either spontaneously or during a tube change. Although uncommon (< 1/1000 tracheostomy tube days), the associated fatality is high due to the loss of airway. Due to the seriousness of such a situation, individuals with a tracheotomy tube should consult with their healthcare providers to have a specific, written, emergency intubation and tracheostomy recannulation (reinsertion) plan prepared in advance.

Tracheal stenosis, otherwise known as an abnormal narrowing of the airway, is a possible long term complication. The most common symptom of stenosis is gradually-worsening difficulty with breathing (dyspnea). However incidence is low, ranging from 0.6 to 2.8% with increased rates if major bleeding or wound infections are present. A 2016 systematic review identified a higher rate of tracheal stenosis in individuals who underwent a surgical tracheostomy, as compared to PDT, however the difference was not statistically significant.

A 2000 Spanish study of bedside percutaneous tracheostomy reported overall complication rates of 10–15% and a procedural mortality of 0%, which is comparable to those of other series reported in the literature from the Netherlands and the United States. A 2013 systematic review calculated procedural mortality to be 0.17% or 1 in 600 cases. Multiple systematic reviews identified no significant difference in rates of mortality, major bleeding, or wound infection between the percutaneous or open surgical methods.

Specifically a 2017 systematic review calculated the most common causes of death and their frequencies, out of all tracheotomies, to be hemorrhage (OST: 0.26%, PDT: 0.19%), loss of airway (OST: 0.21%, PDT: 0.20%), and misplacement of tube (OST: 0.11%, PDT: 0.20%).

A 2003 American cadaveric study identified multiple tracheal ring fractures with the Ciaglia Blue Rhino technique as a complication occurring in 100% of their small series of cases. The comparative study above also identified ring fractures in 9 of 30 live patients while another small series identified ring fractures in 5 of their 20 patients. The long term significance of tracheal ring fractures is unknown.

== History ==
A tracheostomy from prior to the 20th century

=== Ancient history ===
Tracheotomy was first potentially depicted on Egyptian artifacts in 3600 BC. Hippocrates condemned the practice of tracheotomy as incurring an unacceptable risk of damage to the carotid artery. Warning against the possibility of death from inadvertent laceration of the carotid artery during tracheotomy, he instead advocated the practice of tracheal intubation.

Despite the concerns of Hippocrates, it is believed that an early tracheotomy was performed by Asclepiades of Bithynia, who lived in Rome around 100 BC. Galen and Aretaeus, both of whom lived in Rome in the 2nd century AD, credit Asclepiades as being the first physician to perform a non-emergency tracheotomy. Antyllus, another Roman-era Greek physician of the 2nd century AD, supported tracheotomy when treating oral diseases. He refined the technique to be more similar to that used in modern times, recommending that a transverse incision be made between the third and fourth tracheal rings for the treatment of life-threatening airway obstruction.

=== Medieval world ===
The 7th century Byzantine physician Paul of Aegina, an advocate of the procedure, acknowledged previous Greek authors' works on the subject of tracheotomies and provided descriptions of the procedure in his own works. In 1000, Abu al-Qasim al-Zahrawi (936–1013), an Arab who lived in Arabic Spain, published the 30-volume Kitab al-Tasrif, the first illustrated work on surgery. He never performed a tracheotomy, but he did treat a slave girl who had cut her own throat in a suicide attempt. Al-Zahrawi (known to Europeans as Albucasis) sewed up the wound and the girl recovered, thereby proving that an incision in the larynx could heal. Circa AD 1020, Avicenna (980–1037) described tracheal intubation in The Canon of Medicine in order to facilitate breathing. The first clear description of the tracheotomy operation for treating asphyxiation was given by Ibn Zuhr (1091–1161) in the 12th century. According to Mostafa Shehata, Ibn Zuhr (also known as Avenzoar) successfully practiced the tracheotomy procedure on a goat, justifying Galen's approval of the operation.

=== 16th–18th centuries ===
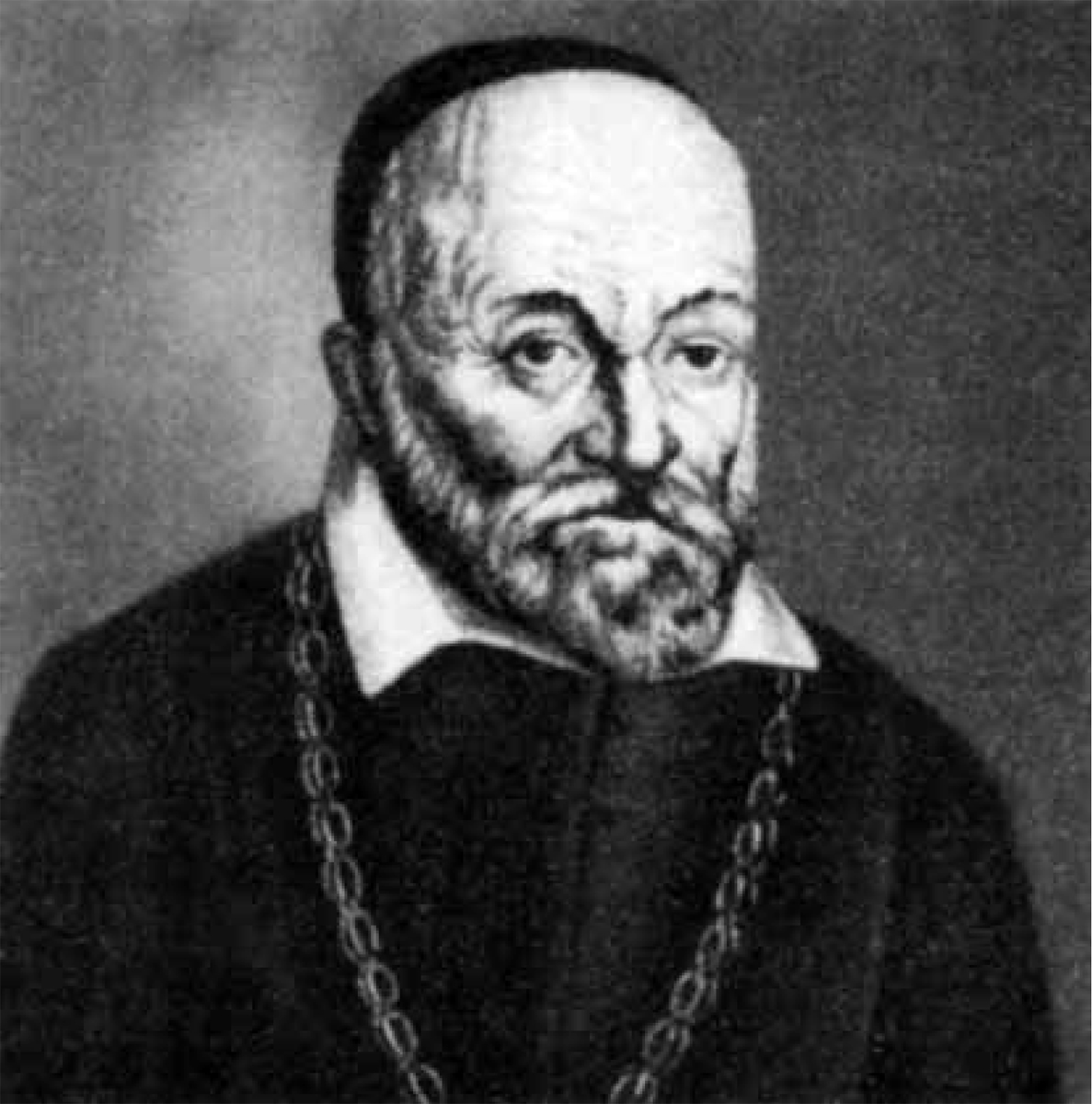
Hieronymus Fabricius (1533–1619) was the first to introduce the idea of a tracheostomy tube

The European Renaissance brought with it significant advances in all scientific fields, particularly surgery. Increased knowledge of anatomy was a major factor in these developments. Surgeons became increasingly open to experimental surgery on the trachea. During this period, many surgeons attempted to perform tracheotomies, for various reasons and with various methods. Many suggestions were put forward, but little actual progress was made toward making the procedure more successful. The tracheotomy remained a dangerous operation with a very low success rate, and many surgeons still considered the tracheotomy to be a useless and dangerous procedure. The high mortality rate for this operation, which had not improved, supported their position. From the period 1500 to 1832 there are only 28 known reports of tracheotomy.

In 1543, Andreas Vesalius (1514–1564) wrote that tracheal intubation and subsequent artificial respiration could be life-saving. Antonio Musa Brassavola (1490–1554) of Ferrara treated a patient with peritonsillar abscess by tracheotomy after the patient had been refused by barber surgeons. The patient apparently made a complete recovery, and Brassavola published his account in 1546. This operation has been identified as the first recorded successful tracheostomy, despite many ancient references to the trachea and possibly to its opening. Ambroise Paré (1510–1590) described suture of tracheal lacerations in the mid-16th century. One patient survived despite a concomitant injury to the internal jugular vein. Another sustained wounds to the trachea and esophagus and died.

Towards the end of the 16th century, anatomist and surgeon Hieronymus Fabricius (1533–1619) described a useful technique for tracheotomy in his writings, although he had never actually performed the operation himself. He advised using a vertical incision and was the first to introduce the idea of a tracheostomy tube. This was a straight, short cannula that incorporated wings to prevent the tube from advancing too far into the trachea. He recommended the operation only as a last resort, to be used in cases of airway obstruction by foreign bodies or secretions. Fabricius' description of the tracheotomy procedure is similar to that used today. Giulio Cesare Casseri (1552–1616) succeeded Fabricius as professor of anatomy at the University of Padua and published his own writings regarding technique and equipment for tracheotomy. Casseri recommended using a curved silver tube with several holes in it. Marco Aurelio Severino (1580–1656), a skillful surgeon and anatomist, performed multiple successful tracheotomies during a diphtheria epidemic in Naples in 1610, using the vertical incision technique recommended by Fabricius. He also developed his own version of a trocar.

In 1620 the French surgeon Nicholas Habicot (1550–1624), surgeon of the Duke of Nemours and anatomist, published a report of four successful "bronchotomies" which he had performed. One of these is the first recorded case of a tracheotomy for the removal of a foreign body, in this instance a blood clot in the larynx of a stabbing victim. He also described the first tracheotomy to be performed on a pediatric patient. A 14-year-old boy swallowed a bag containing 9 gold coins in an attempt to prevent its theft by a highwayman. The object became lodged in his esophagus, obstructing his trachea. Habicot suggested that the operation might also be effective for patients with inflammation of the larynx. He developed equipment for this surgical procedure which displayed similarities to modern designs (except for his use of a single-tube cannula).

Sanctorius (1561–1636) is believed to be the first to use a trocar in the operation, and he recommended leaving the cannula in place for a few days following the operation. Early tracheostomy devices are illustrated in Habicot's Question Chirurgicale and Casseri's posthumous Tabulae anatomicae in 1627. Thomas Fienus (1567–1631), Professor of Medicine at the University of Louvain, was the first to use the word "tracheotomy" in 1649, but this term was not commonly used until a century later. Georg Detharding (1671–1747), professor of anatomy at the University of Rostock, treated a drowning victim with tracheostomy in 1714.

=== 19th century ===
In the 1820s, the tracheotomy began to be recognized as a legitimate means of treating severe airway obstruction. In 1832, French physician Pierre Bretonneau employed it as a last resort to treat a case of diphtheria. In 1852, Bretonneau's student Armand Trousseau reported a series of 169 tracheotomies (158 of which were for croup, and 11 for "chronic maladies of the larynx") In 1858, John Snow was the first to report tracheotomy and cannulation of the trachea for the administration of chloroform anesthesia in an animal model. In 1871, the German surgeon Friedrich Trendelenburg (1844–1924) published a paper describing the first successful elective human tracheotomy to be performed for the purpose of administration of general anesthesia. In 1880, the Scottish surgeon William Macewen (1848–1924) reported on his use of orotracheal intubation as an alternative to tracheotomy to allow a patient with glottic edema to breathe, as well as in the setting of general anesthesia with chloroform. At last, in 1880 Morell Mackenzie's book discussed the symptoms indicating a tracheotomy and when the operation is absolutely necessary.

=== 20th century ===
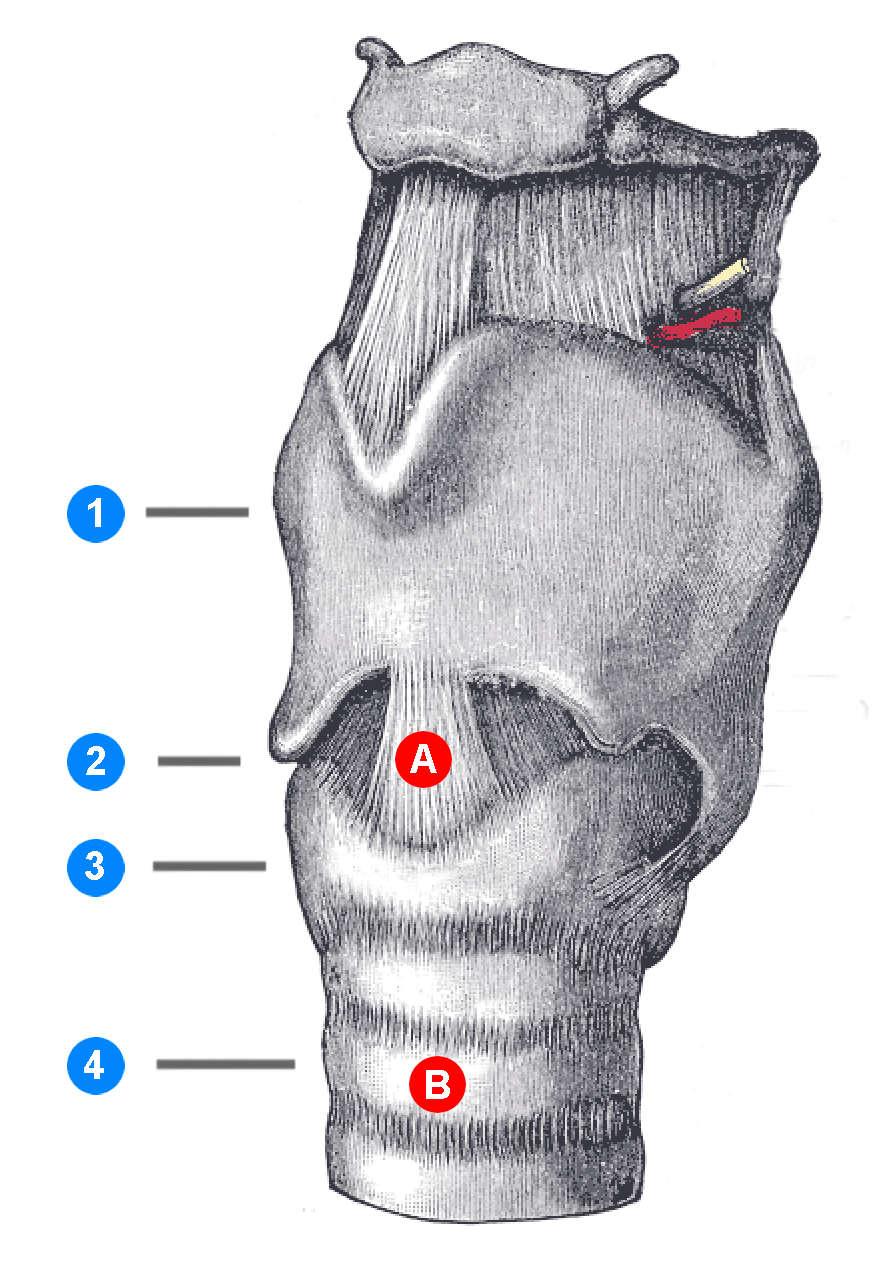
Laryngeal structures, trachea (1–4) and invasive procedures (A–B) (1) Thyroid cartilage (2) Cricothyroid ligament (3) Cricoid cartilage (4) Trachea (A) Cricothyrotomy (B) Tracheotomy

In the early 20th century, physicians began to use the tracheotomy in the treatment of patients affected by paralytic poliomyelitis who required mechanical ventilation. However, surgeons continued to debate various aspects of the tracheotomy well into the 20th century. Many techniques were described and employed, along with many different surgical instruments and tracheal tubes. Surgeons could not seem to reach a consensus on where or how the tracheal incision should be made, arguing whether the "high tracheotomy" or the "low tracheotomy" was more beneficial. The currently used surgical tracheotomy technique was described in 1909 by Chevalier Jackson of Pittsburgh, Pennsylvania. Jackson emphasised the importance of postoperative care, which dramatically reduced the death rate. By 1965, the surgical anatomy was thoroughly and widely understood, antibiotics were widely available and useful for treating postoperative infections, and other major complications had also become more manageable.

== Society and culture ==
Notable individuals who have or have had a tracheotomy include Catherine Zeta-Jones, Mika Häkkinen, Stephen Hawking, Connie Culp, Christopher Reeve, Roy Horn, William Rehnquist, Gabby Giffords, George Michael, Val Kilmer, and many others.

Across movies and TV shows, there are many situations where an emergency procedure is done on an individual's neck to re-establish an airway. An example is in the 2008 horror film, Saw V, in which a character being drowned from the neck up performs a manual tracheotomy, stabbing his neck with a pen to create an airway to breathe through. The most common procedure is a cricothyrotomy (or "crike"), which is an incision through the skin and cricothyroid membrane. This is often confused or misnamed as a tracheotomy (or "trach") and vice versa. However, they are quite different based on location of the opening and length of time the alternate airway is needed.

Another example of an emergency attempt at this procedure is featured in the 2013 comedy film The Heat, where Sandra Bullock’s character, Sarah Ashburn, attempts to perform the operation on a person choking on a pancake in a Denny's, but fails. Melissa McCarthy’s character, Detective Mullens, then presses hard on the man's chest, causing the piece of food to be expelled from his mouth.
