= Laryngotracheal stenosis =

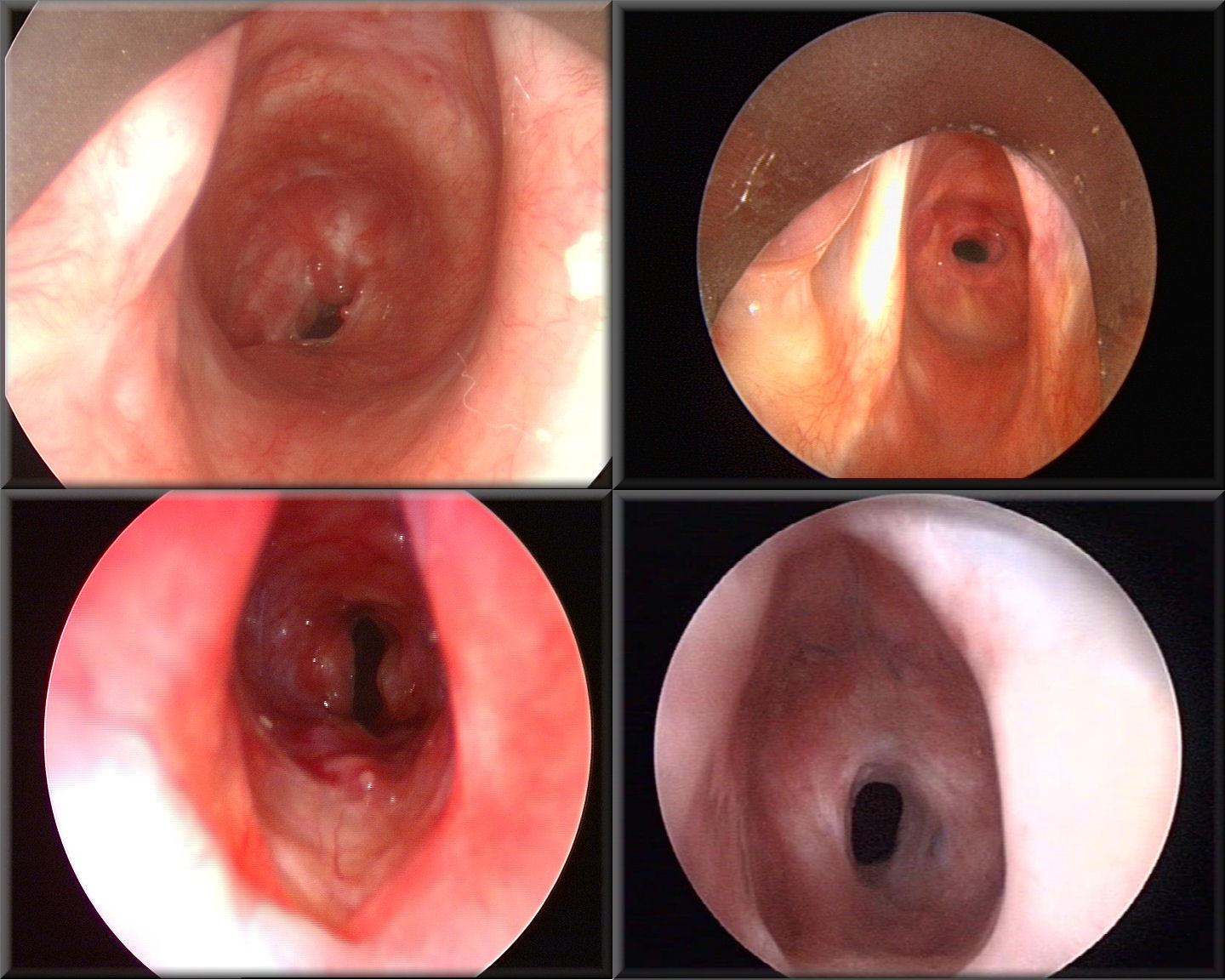
- This condition can also be referred to as subglottic or tracheal stenosis.
- Specialty: Otorhinolaryngology
- Diagnostic method: Patient history, CT scan of neck and chest, fibre-optic bronchoscopy

Laryngotracheal stenosis refers to abnormal narrowing of the central air passageways. This can occur at the level of the larynx, trachea, carina or main bronchi. In a small number of patients narrowing may be present in more than one anatomical location.

== Presentation ==
The most common symptom of laryngotracheal stenosis is gradually-worsening breathlessness (dyspnea) particularly when undertaking physical activities (exertional dyspnea). The patient may also experience added respiratory sounds which in the more severe cases can be identified as stridor but in many cases can be readily mistaken for wheeze. This creates a diagnostic pitfall in which many patients with laryngotracheal stenosis are incorrectly diagnosed as having asthma and are treated for presumed lower airway disease. This increases the likelihood of the patient eventually requiring major open surgery for benign disease and can lead to tracheal cancer presenting too late for curative surgery to be performed.

== Causes ==
Laryngotracheal stenosis is an umbrella term for a wide and heterogeneous group of very rare conditions. The population incidence of adult post-intubation laryngotracheal stenosis which is the commonest benign sub-type of this condition is approximately 1 in 200,000 adults per year. The main causes of adult laryngotracheal stenosis are:

Main causes of laryngotracheal stenosis
	Benign causes	Malignant causes
Extrinsic compression	Thyroid goitre; Thymoma; Mediastinal lymphadenopathy (e.g. TB); Vascular anomalies	Thyroid cancer; Lung cancer/lymphomas-related mediastinal lymphadenopathy
Intrinsic narrowing	At the level of the larynx (glottis); Bilateral vocal fold paralysis; Blunt/sharp laryngeal trauma; Foreign body inhalation; Sarcoidosis; Amyloidosis; Bilateral vocal fold mobility impairment; Crico-arytenoid joint fixation; Rheumatoid arthritis; Intubation-related joint fixation; Inter-arytenoid scarring; Intubation-related; Infections (e.g. Diphtheria, epiglottitis); Respiratory papillomatosis; Large ball-valving vocal polyps; Congenital laryngeal stenosis; Laryngeal atresia; Congenital laryngeal webs; At the level of subglottis/trachea; Intubation/tracheostomy-related (most common cause); Granulomatosis with polyangiitis; Idiopathic Progressive Subglottic Stenosis; Amyloidosis; Tracheopathia osteoplastica; Tracheomalacia; Expiratory Dynamic Airway Collapse (EDAC); Tracheobronchomalacia; Relapsing polychondritis; Tracheal ring damage due to COPD; Tracheal ring weakness; Benign tumors (e.g. Carcinoid); Tracheal trauma / rupture; Congenital subglottic/tracheal anomalies; Complete tracheal rings; Congenital subglottic/tracheal webs; Subglottic haemangioma; Subglottic / tracheal cysts; At the level of carina or main bronchi; Granulomatosis with polyangiitis; Foreign body inhalation; Tuberculosis; Following Photodynamic Therapy	Head and neck (especially laryngeal or supraglottic) cancers; Primary tracheal cancers; Erosive thyroid cancer; Erosive esophageal cancer; Lung cancer causing central airway obstruction

== Diagnosis ==
Patient history, CT scan of neck and chest, fiberoptic bronchoscopy, and spirometry are all several ways to assess for laryngotracheal stenosis and effectively develop preoperational approaches to treating the disease. In addition, a methodology called the Cotton-Myer system is commonly used to evaluate the degree of severity of the laryngotracheal stenosis based on the percentage of obstruction; other systems have also been proposed to fill potential shortcomings of the Cotton-Myer classification and help capture the full complexity of the illness.

== Treatment ==
The optimal management of laryngotracheal stenosis is not well defined, depending mainly on the type of the stenosis. General treatment options include

1. Tracheal dilation using rigid bronchoscope
2. Laser surgery and endoluminal stenting
3. Tracheal resection and laryngotracheal reconstruction

Tracheal dilation is used to temporarily enlarge the airway. The effect of dilation typically lasts from a few days to 6 months. Several studies have shown that as a result of mechanical dilation (used alone) may occur a high mortality rate and a rate of recurrence of stenosis higher than 90%. Thus, many authors treat the stenosis by endoscopic excision with laser (commonly either the carbon dioxide or the neodymium: yttrium aluminum garnet laser) and then by using bronchoscopic dilatation and prolonged stenting with a T-tube (generally in silicone).

There are differing opinions on treating with laser surgery.

In very experienced surgery centers, tracheal resection and reconstruction (anastomosis complete end-to-end with or without laryngotracheal temporary stent to prevent airway collapse) is currently the best alternative to completely cure the stenosis and allows to obtain good results. Therefore, it can be considered the gold standard treatment and is suitable for almost all patients.

The narrowed part of the trachea will be cut off and the cut ends of the trachea sewn together with sutures. For stenosis of length greater than 5 cm a stent may be required to join the sections.

Late June or early July 2010, a new potential treatment was trialed at Great Ormond Street Hospital in London, where Ciaran Finn-Lynch (aged 11) received a transplanted trachea which had been injected with stem cells harvested from his own bone marrow. The use of Ciaran's stem cells was hoped to prevent his immune system from rejecting the transplant, but there remain doubts about the operation's success, and several later attempts at similar surgery have been unsuccessful.

== Nomenclature ==
Laryngotracheal stenosis (Laryngo-: Glottic Stenosis; Subglottic Stenosis; Tracheal: narrowings at different levels of the windpipe) is a more accurate description for this condition when compared, for example to subglottic stenosis which technically only refers to narrowing just below vocal folds or tracheal stenosis. In babies and young children however, the subglottis is the narrowest part of the airway and most stenoses do in fact occur at this level. Subglottic stenosis is often therefore used to describe central airway narrowing in children, and laryngotracheal stenosis is more often used in adults.

== See also ==
- Hermes Grillo pioneer in tracheal resection surgery
- Laryngospasm
