= Steeple sign =

Pattern seen in radiologic examinations

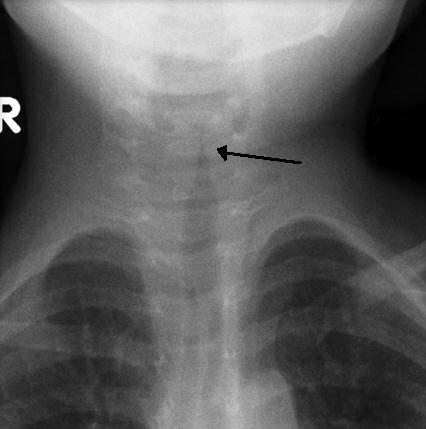
- The steeple sign as seen on an anteroposterior neck X-ray of a child with croup
- Differential diagnosis: Croup

The steeple sign is a radiographic sign found on a neck radiograph which is characterized by subglottic tracheal narrowing. The radiographic appearance is similar to the pointed shape of a Christian church steeple within the trachea itself. The steeple sign is most commonly associated with croup, or laryngotracheobronchitis, which is an upper airway infection that causes inflammation of the larynx and trachea.

== Etymology ==
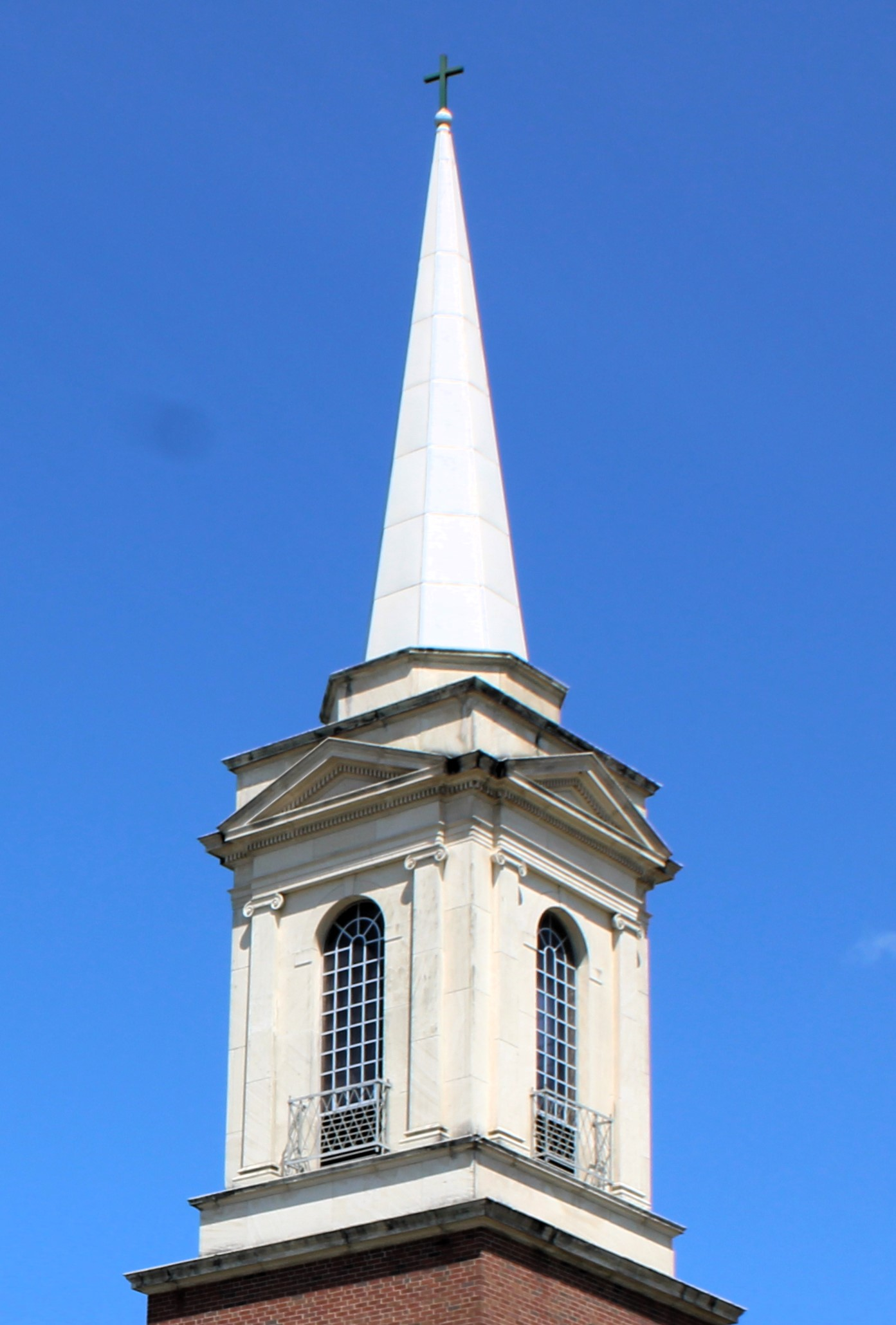
The steeple of Trinity Evangelical-Lutheran Church in Rockford, Illinois

The name of the radiographic sign—steeple sign—owes its name to the structure on Christian churches, steeples, which serve as a clear marker of a Christian church and are "are an elaborate architectural metaphor—a symbol pointing to heaven", directing the minds of the faithful upward to God.

== Radiographic features ==
The steeple sign is typically seen on an anteroposterior radiograph of the neck as a symmetric narrowing of the subglottic airway. This creates a tapered look of the trachea, which occurs just below the level of the vocal cords and may extend into the upper portion of the trachea. The resulting shape resembles a Christian church steeple. A frontal x-ray of the neck can also demonstrate the characteristic steeple sign, but is less commonly used.

== Pathophysiology ==
The steeple sign occurs as a result of inflammation in the subglottic region of the airway. The finding is most associated with croup, which is also known as laryngotracheobronchitis, which is commonly caused by viral infections such as human parainfluenza virus. Less common viral causes can include influenza A and B, adenovirus, rhinovirus, respiratory syncytial virus, and measles. Viral causes are the most common cause, but bacterial causes such as bacterial tracheitis, diphtheria, and staphylococcus aureus can also cause croup. The virus causes inflammation which leads to edema, or swelling, which makes the subglottic region, the most narrow portion of the pediatric airway, susceptible to obstruction. Swelling causes the area below the vocal cords to narrow and leads to the characteristic difficult and noisy breathing, and produces the characteristic narrowing seen on x-ray.

== Clinical significance ==
Croup affects 3% of children six months to 3 years of age, and is less common in older infants and adults. This is due to widening of the airway as humans get older which makes swelling less obstructive. The presence of the steeple sign can support the diagnosis of croup in children with symptoms such as barking cough, inspiratory stridor, and hoarseness. However, the steeple sign is not present in all cases and is not considered highly sensitive or specific for the condition. Many upper airway infections can lead to edema and has been only shown to be present in 50% of cases. Imaging is usually reserved for atypical presentations or when other causes of airway obstruction are being considered. In severe cases of croup, progressive airway narrowing can lead to respiratory distress or even respiratory failure. Airway protection is one of the most important aspects of monitoring a child with steeple sign or airway narrowing. Most patients are treated with steroids, and racemic epinephrine is recommended for patients with moderate to severe croup.

== Differential diagnosis ==
Several conditions may produce radiographic findings similar to the steeple sign. The diagnosis of croup is mostly clinical, so providers must exclude acutely life threatening conditions first. These include epiglottitis, bacterial tracheitis, subglottic stenosis and airway obstruction due to foreign body aspiration. Croup and epiglottitis are very important to distinguish to avoid life-threatening airway obstruction. Children with epiglottitis often present with more complaints of a sore throat, higher mean age of onset, and more severe findings than children with croup. Additionally, they can present with a tripod position, drooling, high fever, and thumbprint sign. Imaging can help distinguish between the two if needed. Clinical findings and additional imaging are often needed to distinguish between these conditions.
