= Laryngotracheal reconstruction =

Laryngotracheal reconstruction is a surgical procedure that involves expanding or removing parts of the airway to widen a narrowing within it, called laryngotracheal stenosis or subglottic stenosis.

== Types ==
=== Anterior and Posterior grafts ===
Anterior grafts can be performed using tissue from the thyroid ala cartilage or the costal cartilage.

Posterior grafts are generally made using costal cartilage.

=== Resection Techniques ===
Cricotracheal resection

Tracheal resection

Slide tracheoplasty

=== Combined Expansion and Resection Techniques ===
Slide tracheoplasty into cricoid split

Slide tracheoplasty with tracheal resection

== History ==
The first description of the anterior cricoid split appears in the early 1900s by Killian and the first description of the posterior cricoid split is credited to Galebsky in 1927. In 1938, Looper rotated the hyoid bone to augment a stenotic adult laryngeal fracture sustained in a railroad accident. In 1968, Lapidot used this principle in piglets to show that a flap of thyroid cartilage rotated on perichondrium to replace a segment of resected cricoid cartilage could survive, suggesting that laryngeal growth could continue after reconstruction without restenosis.

Great advances in open airway reconstruction were made in the 1970s, many of which occurred in Toronto, Canada. In 1971, Fearon and Ellis described a child with severe subglottic stenosis who, after failed dilatations and anterior cricoid split with auricular cartilage graft augmentation, eventually underwent tracheotomy, placement of an anterior costal cartilage graft with buccal mucosa and a stent and was eventually decannulated. Fearon and Cotton further investigated tracheal augmentation using thyroid cartilage (harvested from the inferior border) in African green monkeys and proved that the cricoid could be divided without inhibition of laryngeal growth. In 1976, Fearon and Cinnamond reported on 35 patients operated on using this technique between 1970 and 1976, noting that free thyroid grafts were more feasible than pedicled grafts and that costal cartilage was most suitable for repairing long segment stenoses. They also proposed that shaping anterior costal cartilage grafts with flanges might prevent them from being displaced inward into the trachea. Cotton would later be the first to describe in detail the process of harvesting, carving and insetting an anterior costal cartilage graft along with his success using this technique in 11 children after moving to Cincinnati. In 1973, Crysdale visited Grahne in Helsinki, Finland, to observe an anterior-posterior cricoid split with stent placement and was the first to perform this procedure in a child in North America. A search for less morbid sources of cartilage for anterior cricoid augmentation in neonates allowed Park and Forte (1999) to demonstrate that bilateral cartilaginous grafts could be harvested from the superior aspect of the thyroid cartilage in kittens without airway compromise. Success using this technique was later demonstrated in 2001 by Forte, Chang, and Papsin in a series of 17 children. For more severe subglottic stenoses, Gerwat and Bryce (1974) described the first cricotracheal resection with preservation of the recurrent laryngeal nerves. Pearson and Gullane would later report their success using this procedure over the ensuing 22 years in 80 consecutive adults with benign subglottic stenosis. Impressed by the results of Gerwat and Bryce, Monnier, Savary, and Chapuis performed the first cricoid resection with primary anastomosis in a child in 1978.
