= Thumbprint (disambiguation) =

A thumbprint is a form of fingerprint.

Thumbprint may also refer to:

- Carbon thumbprint, the carbon dioxide equivalent impact of an individual product or service
- Thumbprint sign, a term in radiology
- Thumbprint, a term for public key fingerprint used in Microsoft software
- Thumbprint, a novel by Friedrich Glauser turned into a film in 1939, and introducing Glauser's most famous character, Sergeant Studer.
- "Thumbprint", a 2007 short story and 2013 comic by Joe Hill
- Thumbprint cookie, in which a well is made with the thumb and filled with jam or filling
- Regmaglypt, the characteristic thumbprint-shaped depressions on a meteorite caused by ablation
