= Rising of the lights =

Archaic medical expression

Rising of the lights was an illness or obstructive condition of the larynx, trachea or lungs, possibly croup. It was a common entry on bills of mortality in the 17th century. Lights in this case referred to the lungs.

== In culture ==
In his A New Booke of Mistakes (1637), Robert Chamberlain gives a humorous epitaph:

Of one Parkins a boone Companion in Essex who dyed of the rising of the Lights.

Poore Parkins, now percust here lies,
Light hearted, till his Lights did rise.
Lights of the Body, are the Bellowes,
And hee, one of the best good fellowes
That Essex yeelded, (all we do know)
And breath'd, till they did cease to blow.
