= Cricoidectomy =

- Specialty: Otolaryngologist

A cricoidectomy is the surgical excision of the cricoid cartilage. The excision can often be performed under local anaesthetic and can either be partial or total. The procedure may be necessary as a treatment of pulmonary aspiration, to prevent progression to aspiration pneumonia. As the cricoid cartilage is the narrowest part of the trachea, it is also a common point of a blockage or narrowing (stenosis).
