= Otolaryngologic Clinics of North America =

- Discipline: Otolaryngology
- Language: English

Publication details
- Publisher: Elsevier
- Impact factor: 3.346 (2021)

Standard abbreviations
- ISO 4: Otolaryngol. Clin. N. Am.

Links
- Journal homepage; Online archive

Otolaryngologic Clinics of North America is a medical journal that covers the latest trends in patient management and provides a sound basis for choosing treatment options. The journal is published by Elsevier.

== Abstracting and indexing ==
The journal is abstracted and indexed in:

- Embase
- PubMed/Medline
- BIOSIS Citation Index
- Current Contents - Clinical Medicine
- Web of Science
- Science Citation Index
- Research Alert

According to the Journal Citation Reports, the journal has a 2021 impact factor of 3.346.
