= Hermes Grillo =

American surgeon

Hermes C. Grillo (1923–2006) was a world-famous thoracic surgeon and professor of surgery at Harvard Medical School.

He was born in Boston in 1923 and died at age 83 in a car accident in Italy on October 14, 2006. He is considered the father of tracheal surgery and wrote what is considered the definitive text on the subject, "Surgery of the Trachea and Bronchi", published in 2004.

He graduated from Brown University in 1943 and Harvard Medical School in 1947. He served in the US Navy during the Korean War as a Division Surgeon with the US Marine Corps. He returned to Boston after the war and was chief of thoracic surgery at the Massachusetts General Hospital from 1969 to 1994.

During his years as a thoracic surgeon he created several new surgical instruments in order to successfully operate on the trachea. As of 2004, these tools are still part of multiple 'Grillo Kits' that surgeons can still use in operations at the Massachusetts General Hospital.
