= Otorhinolaryngology =

Medical specialty of the head and neck

- Significant diseases: Dizziness, head and neck cancer, sinusitis, chronic ear disease, hoarseness, nasal obstruction
- Specialist: Otorhinolaryngologist
- Glossary: Glossary of medicine

Otolaryngologist
Occupation
- Names: Physician; Surgeon
- Occupation type: Specialty
- Activity sectors: Medicine, surgery

Description
- Education required: Doctor of Medicine (M.D.) or Doctor of Osteopathic Medicine (D.O.); Bachelor of Medicine, Bachelor of Surgery (M.B.B.S.); Bachelor of Medicine, Bachelor of Surgery (MBChB)
- Fields of employment: Hospitals, clinics

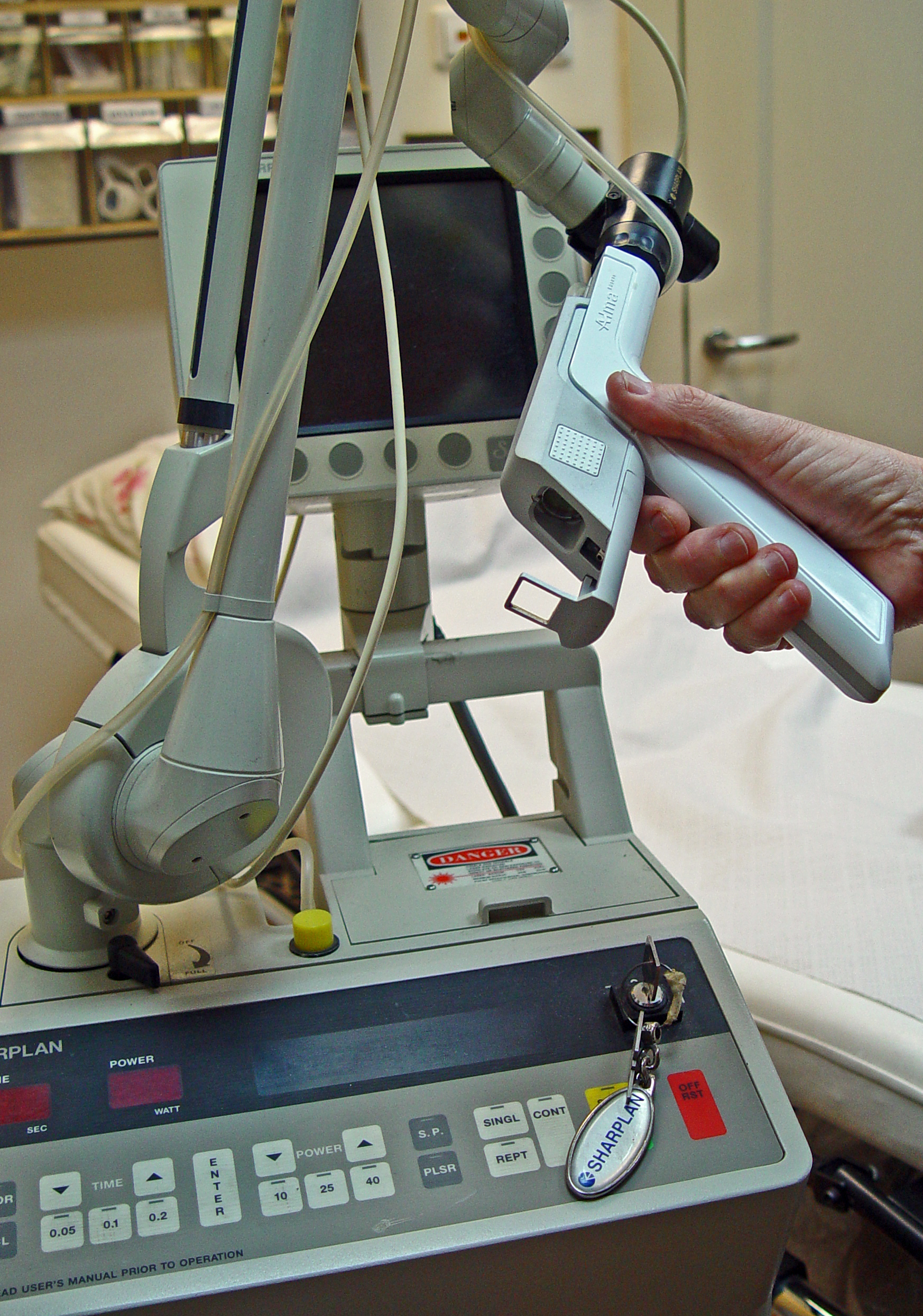
A 40-watt CO_{2} laser used in otorhinolaryngology

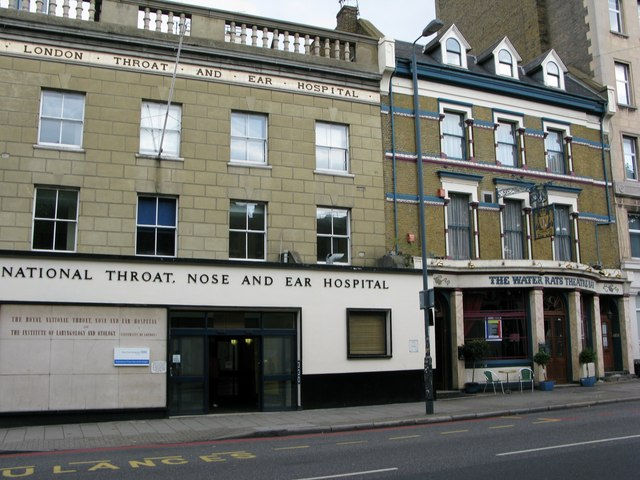
Royal National Throat, Nose and Ear Hospital founded in 1874, in London

Otorhinolaryngology (/oʊtoʊˌraɪnoʊˌlærɪnˈɡɒlədʒi/ oh-toh-RY-noh-LARR-in-GOL-ə-jee, abbreviated ORL), also known as otolaryngology, otolaryngology – head and neck surgery (ORL–H&N or OHNS), or ear, nose, and throat (ENT), is a surgical subspecialty within medicine that deals with the surgical and medical management of conditions of the head and neck. Doctors who specialize in this area are called otorhinolaryngologists, otolaryngologists, head and neck surgeons, or ENT surgeons or physicians.

The ear, nose, and throat operate as an interconnected system, linked to each other via the Eustachian tube.

Patients seek treatment from an otorhinolaryngologist for diseases of the ear, nose, throat, base of the skull, head, and neck. These commonly include functional diseases that affect the senses and activities of eating, drinking, speaking, breathing, swallowing, and hearing. In addition, ENT surgery encompasses the surgical management of cancers and benign tumors, reconstruction of the head and neck, and plastic surgery of the face, scalp, and neck.

In modern otorhinolaryngology, laser-assisted surgical techniques are used for various indications. Depending on the laser system and clinical indication, these techniques can be used for tissue resection, coagulation, or vaporization. They may provide a minimally invasive and tissue-sparing approach to lesions and are often associated with good hemostasis.

== Etymology ==
The term is a combination of Neo-Latin combining forms (oto- + rhino- + laryngo- + -logy) derived from four Ancient Greek words: (cf. Greek ωτορινολαρυγγολόγος 'otorhinolaryngologist').

1. οὖς (ous), 'ear', whose genitive is ὠτός (otos)
2. ῥίς (rhis) 'nose'
3. λάρυγξ (larynx) 'larynx'
4. -λογία (logia) 'study'

== Training ==
Otorhinolaryngologists are physicians (MD, DO, MBBS, MBChB, etc.) who complete both medical school and an average of 5-7 years of post-graduate surgical training in ORL-H&N. In the United States, trainees complete at least five years of surgical residency training. This comprises three to six months of general surgical training and four and a half years in ORL-H&N specialist surgery. In Canada and the United States, practitioners complete a five-year residency training after medical school.

Following residency training, some otolaryngologist-head & neck surgeons complete an advanced sub-specialty fellowship, where training can last for one to two years. Fellowships include head and neck surgical oncology, facial plastic surgery, rhinology and sinus surgery, neuro-otology, pediatric otolaryngology, and laryngology. In the United States and Canada, otorhinolaryngology is among the most competitive medical specialties for residency positions following medical school.

In the United Kingdom, entrance to higher surgical training is competitive. It involves a rigorous national selection process. The training programme consists of 6 years of higher surgical training after which trainees frequently undertake fellowships in a sub-speciality before becoming a consultant.

The typical total length of education, training, and post-secondary school is 12–14 years. Otolaryngology is among the more highly compensated surgical specialties in the United States. In 2022, the average annual income was $469,000.

== Sub-specialties ==
Head and neck oncologic surgery	Facial plastic and reconstructive surgery*	Otology	Neurotology*	Rhinology / sinus / anterior skull base surgery	Laryngology and voice disorders	Pediatric otorhinolaryngology*	Sleep medicine*
Surgical oncology	Facial cosmetic surgery	Ear	Middle and inner ear	Sinusitis	Voice disorders	Velopalatine insufficiency	Sleep disorders
Microvascular reconstruction	Maxillofacial surgery	Hearing	Temporal bone	Allergy	Phono-surgery	Cleft lip and palate	Sleep apnea surgery
Endocrine surgery	Traumatic reconstruction	Balance	Skull base surgery	Anterior skull base	Swallowing disorders	Airway	Sleep investigations
Endoscopic surgery	Craniofacial surgery		Dizziness	Apnea and snoring		Vascular malformations	
			Cochlear implant / BAHA			Cochlear implant/BAHA	

(*Currently recognized by American Board of Medical Subspecialties)

== Topics by subspecialty ==
=== Head and neck surgery ===
- Head and neck surgical oncology (field of surgery treating cancer/malignancy of the head and neck)
  - Head and neck mucosal malignancy (cancer of the pink lining of the upper aerodigestive tract)
    - Oral cancer (cancer of lips, gums, tongue, hard palate, cheek, floor of mouth)
    - Oropharyngeal cancer (cancer of the oropharynx, soft palate, tonsil, base of tongue)
    - Larynx cancer (voice box cancer)
    - Hypopharynx cancer (lower throat cancer)
    - Sinonasal cancer
    - Nasopharyngeal cancer
  - Skin cancer of the head & neck
  - Thyroid cancer
  - Salivary gland cancer
  - Head and neck sarcoma
- Endocrine surgery of the head and neck
  - Thyroid surgery
  - Parathyroid surgery
- Microvascular free flap reconstructive surgery
- Skull base surgery
- Transoral laser microsurgery - used for selected laryngeal conditions, including early laryngeal cancers, premalignant lesions, recurrent respiratory papillomatosis, and laryngeal stenoses

=== Otology and neurotology ===
Study of diseases of the outer ear, middle ear and mastoid, and inner ear, and surrounding structures (such as the facial nerve and lateral skull base)

- Outer ear diseases
  - Otitis externa –
    - outer ear or ear canal inflammation
  - Exostoses or Surfer's ear are bony growths in the outer ear canal
- Middle ear and mastoid diseases
  - Otitis media – middle ear inflammation
  - Perforated eardrum (hole in the eardrum due to infection, trauma, explosion, or loud noise)
  - Mastoiditis
- Inner ear diseases
  - BPPV – benign paroxysmal positional vertigo
  - Labyrinthitis/Vestibular neuronitis
  - Ménière's disease/Endolymphatic hydrops
  - Perilymphatic fistula
  - Acoustic neuroma, vestibular schwannoma
- Facial nerve disease
  - Idiopathic facial palsy (Bell's Palsy)
  - Facial nerve tumors
  - Ramsay Hunt Syndrome
- Symptoms
  - Hearing loss
  - Tinnitus (subjective noise in the ear)
  - Aural fullness (sense of fullness in the ear)
  - Otalgia (pain referring to the ear)
  - Otorrhea (fluid draining from the ear)
  - Vertigo
  - Imbalance

=== Rhinology ===
Rhinology includes nasal dysfunction and sinus diseases.

- Nasal obstruction
  - Inferior turbinate hypertrophy
  - Nasal septum deviation
  - Chronic sinusitis with nasal polyps
- Sinusitis – acute, chronic
- Environmental allergies
- Rhinitis
- Pituitary tumor
- Empty nose syndrome
- Severe or recurrent epistaxis
- Laser surgery - used for selected nasal conditions, including inferior turbinate hypertrophy and recurrent epistaxis associated with hereditary hemorrhagic telangiectasia (HHT; Osler-Weber-Rendu syndrome)

=== Pediatric otorhinolaryngology ===
- Adenoidectomy
- Caustic ingestion
- Cricotracheal resection
- Decannulation
- Laryngomalacia
- Laryngotracheal reconstruction
- Myringotomy and tubes
- Obstructive sleep apnea – pediatric
- Tonsillectomy
- Laser-assisted tonsillotomy is used in selected pediatric patients with tonsillar hyperplasia

=== Laryngology ===
- Dysphonia/hoarseness
  - Laryngitis
  - Reinke's edema
  - Vocal cord nodules and polyps
- Spasmodic dysphonia
- Tracheostomy
- Cancer of the larynx
- Vocology – science and practice of voice habilitation
- Muteness and selective muteness
- Laser-assisted surgery - transoral laser microsurgery is used for laryngeal keratosis, dysplasia, carcinoma in situ, and early-stage laryngeal squamous cell carcinoma

=== Facial plastic and reconstructive surgery ===
Facial plastic and reconstructive surgery is a one-year fellowship open to otorhinolaryngologists who wish to begin learning the aesthetic and reconstructive surgical principles of the head, face, and neck pioneered by the specialty of Plastic and Reconstructive Surgery.

- Rhinoplasty and septoplasty
- Facelift (rhytidectomy)
- Browlift
- Blepharoplasty
- Otoplasty
- Genioplasty
- Injectable cosmetic treatments
- Trauma to the face
  - Nasal bone fracture
  - Mandible fracture
  - Orbital fracture
  - Frontal sinus fracture
  - Complex lacerations and soft tissue damage
- Skin cancer (e.g. Basal Cell Carcinoma)

=== Sleep surgery ===
Sleep surgery encompasses any surgery that alleviates obstructive sleep apnea and can anatomically include any part of the upper airway.

- Nasal cavity / nasopharynx
  - Septoplasty
  - Adenoidectomy (especially in pediatrics)
- Oral cavity / oropharynx
  - Tonsillectomy (especially in pediatrics)
  - Uvulopalatopharyngoplasty
  - Transoral midline glossectomy
  - Genioglossus advancement
- Other
  - Hyoid suspension
  - Maxillomandibular advancement
  - Hypoglossal nerve stimulation

=== Microvascular reconstruction repair ===
Microvascular reconstruction repairs are commonly performed on patients consulting an otorhinolaryngologist. It is a surgical procedure that involves moving a composite piece of tissue from the patient's body to the head and/or neck. Microvascular head-and-neck reconstruction is used to treat head-and-neck cancers, including those of the larynx and pharynx, oral cavity, salivary glands, jaws, calvarium, sinuses, tongue, and skin. The tissue most commonly moved during this procedure is from the arms, legs, and back, and can come from the skin, bone, fat, and/or muscle.

When performing this procedure, the reconstructive needs determine which is moved. Transfer of the tissue to the head and neck allows surgeons to rebuild the patient's jaw, optimize tongue function, and reconstruct the throat. When pieces of tissue are moved, they require their own blood supply to survive in their new location. After the surgery is completed, the blood vessels that feed the tissue transplant are reconnected to new blood vessels in the neck. These blood vessels are typically no more than 1 to 3 millimeters in diameter, which means that these connections need to be made with a microscope, which is why the procedure is called "microvascular surgery".

== See also ==
- Audiology
- Head and neck anatomy
- Head and neck cancer
- Head mirror
- Oral and maxillofacial surgery
- Plastic and Reconstructive Surgery
- Speech–language pathology
- Otolaryngologic Clinics of North America
