= Robin T. Cotton =

Robin Thomas Cotton (born May 13, 1941) is an English physician who is well known for his work in pediatric otolaryngology. He is retired from being the Director of Otolaryngology/Head and Neck Surgery at the Cincinnati Children's Hospital Medical Center in Cincinnati, Ohio, in the United States.

== Biography ==
Robin Cotton was born in England and received his MD from The University of Cambridge in 1966. He completed a residency in General Surgery at the United Birmingham Hospital in Birmingham, England in 1968, and a residency and Fellowship in Otolaryngology Residency at the University of Toronto in Toronto, Canada from 1971 to 1972.

Cotton is a member of over twenty national and international Otolaryngology organizations including the American Academy of Otolaryngology and has been a diplomate of the American Board of Otolaryngology since 1972. Cotton received a Head and Neck Fellowship at the University of Cincinnati in 1973 where he now holds the rank of Professor within the Department of Otolaryngology.

Cotton has led the Department of Pediatric Otolaryngology since completing his fellowship at the University of Cincinnati. With nearly 33,000 outpatient visits and 11,000 procedures each year, his department is one of the busiest surgical subspecialties at Cincinnati Children's Hospital Medical Center.

At Cincinnati Children's Hospital Medical Center, Cotton was largely responsible for developing an interdisciplinary approach for the treatment of complex airway disorders, the Aerodigestive and Sleep Center (ADSC). Directed by Cotton, the ADSC draws patients from around the world and offers them coordinated care among a variety of specialties.

== Awards ==
- Gabriel F. Tucker Award of the American Laryngological Association - 1995
- Friend of Children PTA Award 2002
- America’s Top Doctors 2002
- Best Doctor’s in America 2002-2003
- DeRoaldes Award 2003
- Best Doctor’s in America 2003-2004
- Ronald McDonald Lifetime Achievement Award 2004
- Robert Ruben Award for Scientific Advancement in Treatment of Ped ORL Disorders. 2005
- 2005 Health Care Hero Innovator Nominee Award – Cincinnati Business Courier
- 2005 Health Care Hero Innovator Winner Award – Cincinnati Business Courier
- Daniel Drake Medal (University of Cincinnati College of Medicine) 2012
