= Cricotracheal ligament =

Ligament in the neck

Details

Identifiers
- Latin: ligamentum cricotracheale
- TA98: A06.2.03.010
- TA2: 1663
- FMA: 55259

The cricotracheal ligament connects (the inferior border of) the cricoid cartilage superiorly, and the first tracheal cartilage ring inferiorly. It is continuous with the tracheal perichondrium and resembles the fibrous membrane which connects the cartilaginous rings of the trachea to each other.

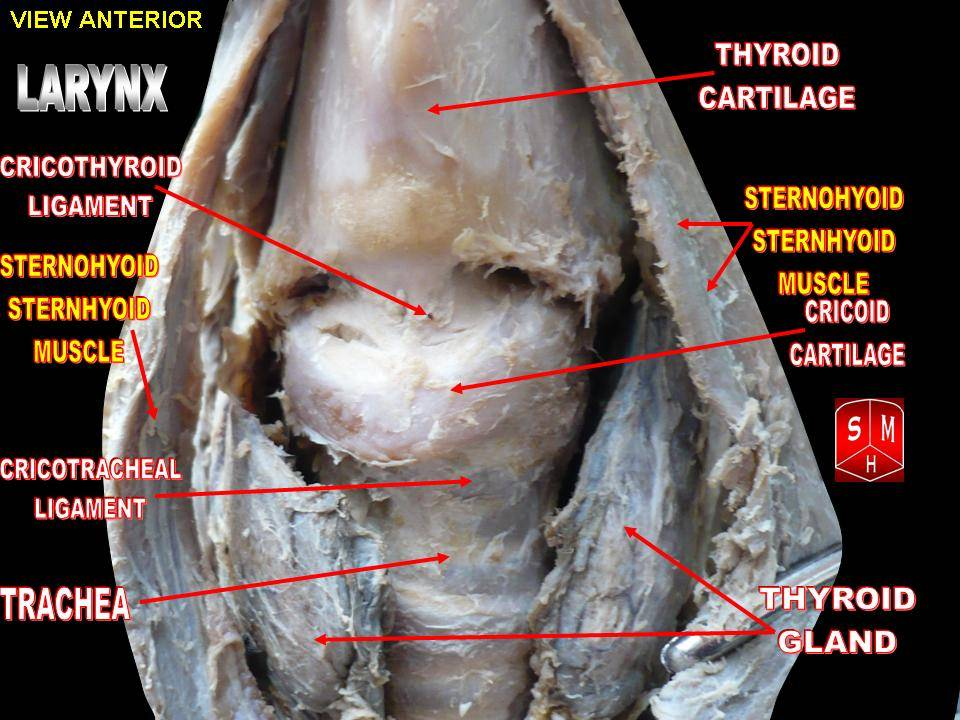
Cricotracheal ligament
