= Chronic ear disease =

Chronic ear disease may refer to:

- Cholesteatoma
- Eustachian tube dysfunction
- Ménière's disease
- Mastoiditis
- Otitis externa
- Otitis media
- Otosclerosis
- Tympanosclerosis
