= Cricoid cartilage =

Complete ring of cartilage around the trachea

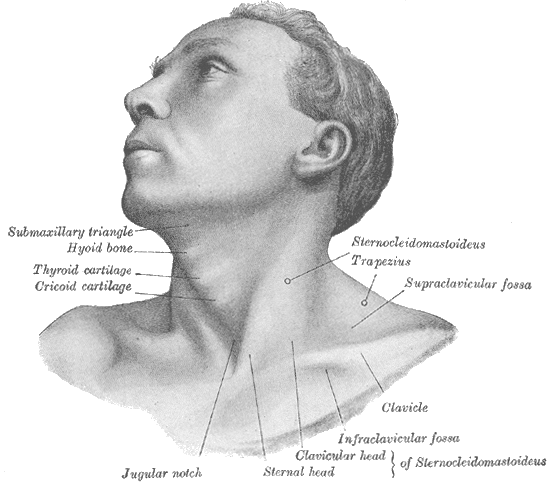
- Anterolateral view of head and neck (cricoid cartilage labeled at center left)

- Antero-lateral view of the ligaments of the larynx (cricoid cartilage visible near bottom center)

Details
- Precursor: 4th and 6th pharyngeal arch

Identifiers
- Latin: cartilago cricoidea
- MeSH: D003413
- TA98: A06.2.03.001
- TA2: 978
- FMA: 9615

The cricoid cartilage /ˌkraɪkɔɪd ˈkɑːrtɪlɪdʒ/, or simply cricoid (from the Greek krikoeides meaning "ring-shaped") or cricoid ring, is the only complete ring of cartilage around the trachea. It forms the back part of the voice box and functions as an attachment site for muscles, cartilages, and ligaments involved in opening and closing the airway and in producing speech.

== Anatomy ==
The cricoid cartilage is the only laryngeal cartilage to form a complete circle around the airway. It is smaller yet thicker and tougher than the thyroid cartilage above.

It articulates superiorly with the thyroid cartilage, and the paired arytenoid cartilage. Inferiorly, the trachea attaches onto it. It occurs at the level of the C6 vertebra.

=== Structure ===
The posterior part of the cricoid cartilage (cricoid lamina) is somewhat broader than the anterior and lateral part (cricoid arch). Its shape is said to resemble a signet ring.

==== Cricoid arch ====
The cricoid arch is the curved and vertically narrow anterior portion of the cricoid cartilage. Anteriorly, it measures 5–7 mm superoinferiorly; it becomes wider on eithers side towards its transition into the cricoid lamina of that side.

The superior margin of the cricoid arch is rather elliptical in outline; the inferior margin is nearly horizontal and circular in outline.

The cricoid arch is palpable inferior to the laryngeal prominence, with an interval containing a depression (beneath which is the conus elasticus) between the two.

==== Cricoid lamina ====
The cricoid lamina is the roughly quadrilateral broader and flatter posterior portion of the cricoid cartilage. It measures 2–3 cm superoposteriorly.

The cricoid lamina exhibits a midline vertical ridge posteriorly; the ridge creates posterior concavities to either side.

=== Relations ===
It is anatomically related to the thyroid gland; although the thyroid isthmus is inferior to it, the two lobes of the thyroid extend superiorly on each side of the cricoid as far as the thyroid cartilage above.

=== Attachments ===
The thyroid cartilage and cricoid cartilage are connected medially by the median cricothyroid ligament, and postero-laterally by the cricothyroid joints.

The cricoid is joined with the first tracheal ring inferiorly by the cricotracheal ligament.

The cricothyroid muscle attaches to the anterior and lateral external aspects of the cricoid arch.

The cricopharyngeus part of inferior pharyngeal constrictor muscle attaches onto the cricoid arch posterior to the attachment of the cricothyroid muscle.

=== Histology ===
It is made of hyaline cartilage, and so can become calcified or even ossified, particularly in old age.

== Function ==
The function of the cricoid cartilage is to provide attachments for the cricothyroid muscle, posterior cricoarytenoid muscle and lateral cricoarytenoid muscle muscles, cartilages, and ligaments involved in opening and closing the airway and in speech production.

== Clinical significance ==
When intubating a patient under general anesthesia prior to surgery, the anesthesiologist will press on the cricoid cartilage to compress the esophagus behind it so as to prevent gastric reflux from occurring: this is known as the Sellick manoeuvre. The Sellick Manoeuvre is typically only applied during a Rapid Sequence Induction (RSI), an induction technique reserved for those at high risk of aspiration.

The Sellick maneuver was considered the standard of care during rapid sequence induction for many years. The American Heart Association still advocates the use of cricoid pressure during resuscitation using a bag valve mask (BVM) and during emergent oral endotracheal intubation. However, recent research increasingly suggests that cricoid pressure may not be as advantageous as once thought. The initial article by Sellick was based on a small sample size at a time when high tidal volumes, head-down positioning, and barbiturate anesthesia were the rule.

Cricoid pressure may frequently be applied incorrectly. Cricoid pressure may frequently displace the esophagus laterally, instead of compressing it as described by Sellick. Several studies demonstrate some degree of glottic compression reduction in tidal volume and increase in peak pressures. Based on the current literature, the widespread recommendation that cricoid pressure be applied during every rapid sequence intubation is quickly falling out of favor.

Gastric reflux could cause aspiration if this is not done considering the general anesthesia can cause relaxation of the gastroesophageal sphincter allowing stomach contents to ascend through the esophagus into the trachea.

A medical procedure known as a cricoidectomy can be performed in which part or all of the cricoid cartilage is removed. This is commonly done to relieve blockages within the trachea.

Fractures of the cricoid cartilage can be seen after manual strangulation also known as throttling.

== Additional images ==
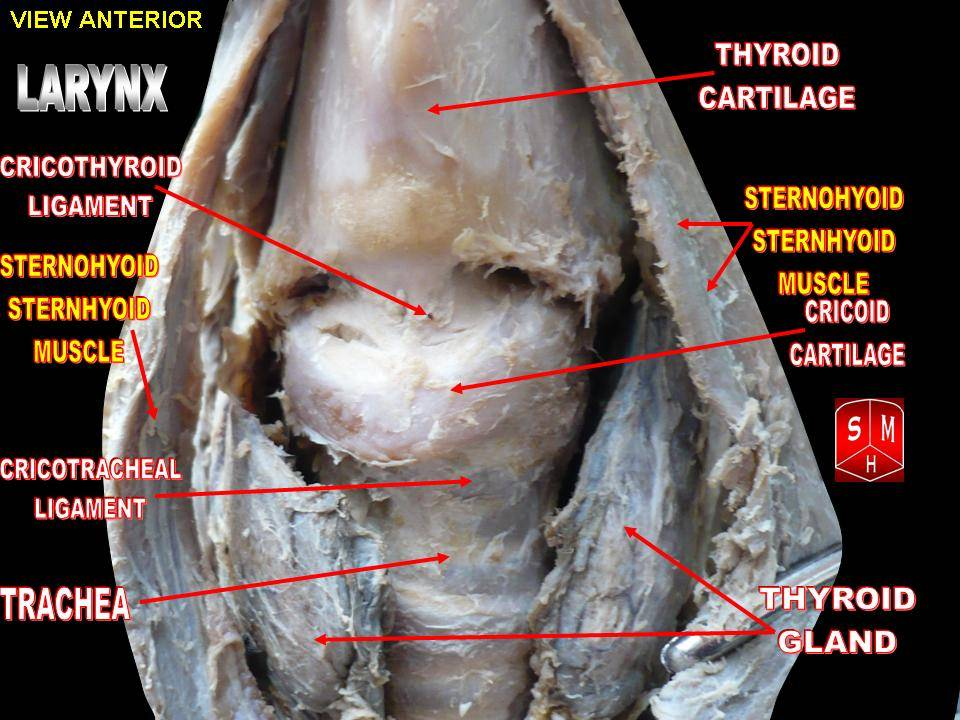
Cricoid cartilage

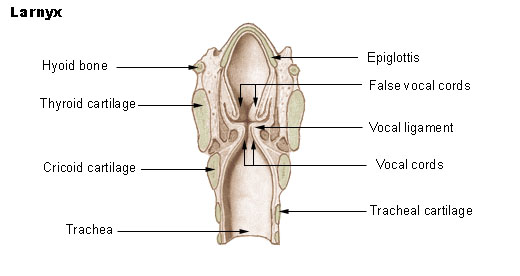
Larynx

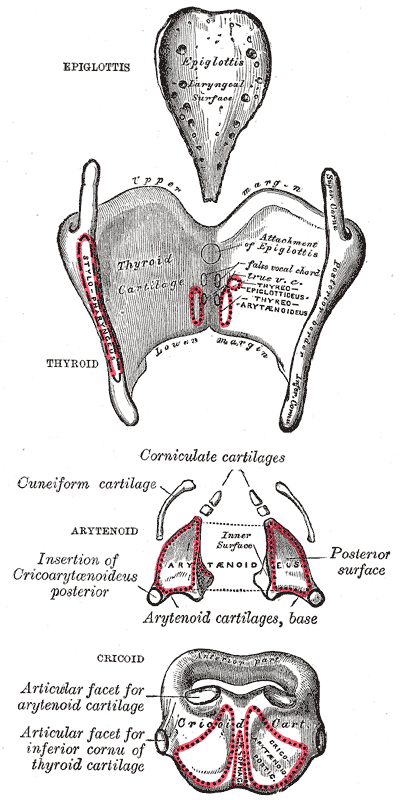
The cartilages of the larynx. Posterior view.

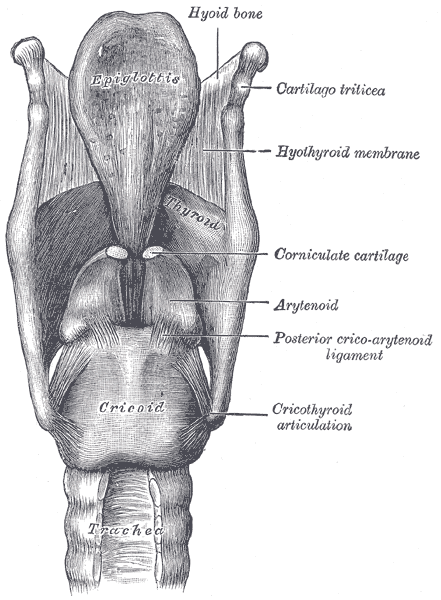
Ligaments of the larynx. Posterior view.

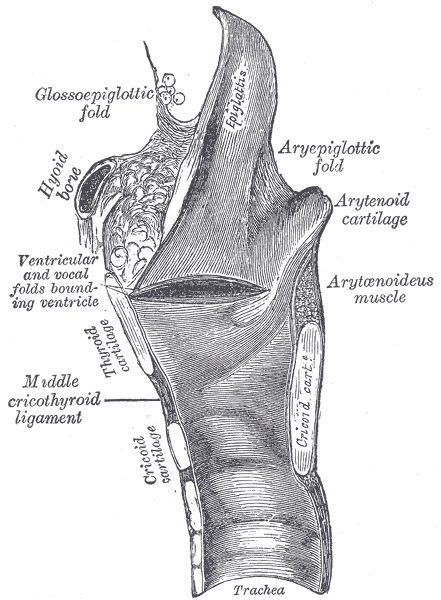
Sagittal section of the larynx and upper part of the trachea.

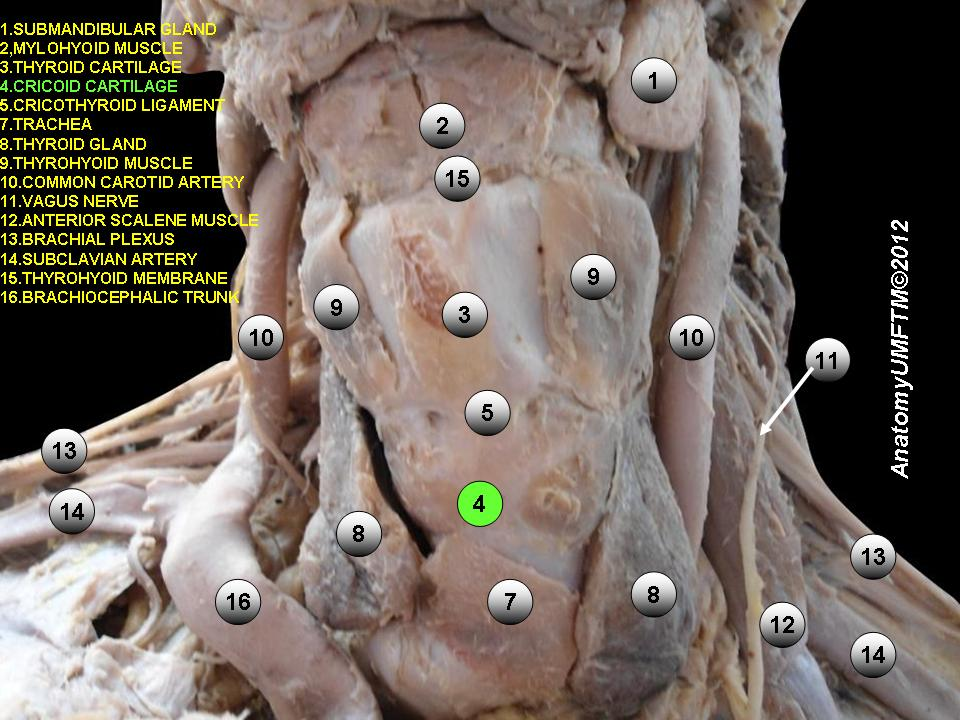
Cricoid cartilage

== See also ==
- Tracheotomy
