= Tracheitis =

Inflammation of the trachea

- Other names: Inflammation of the trachea
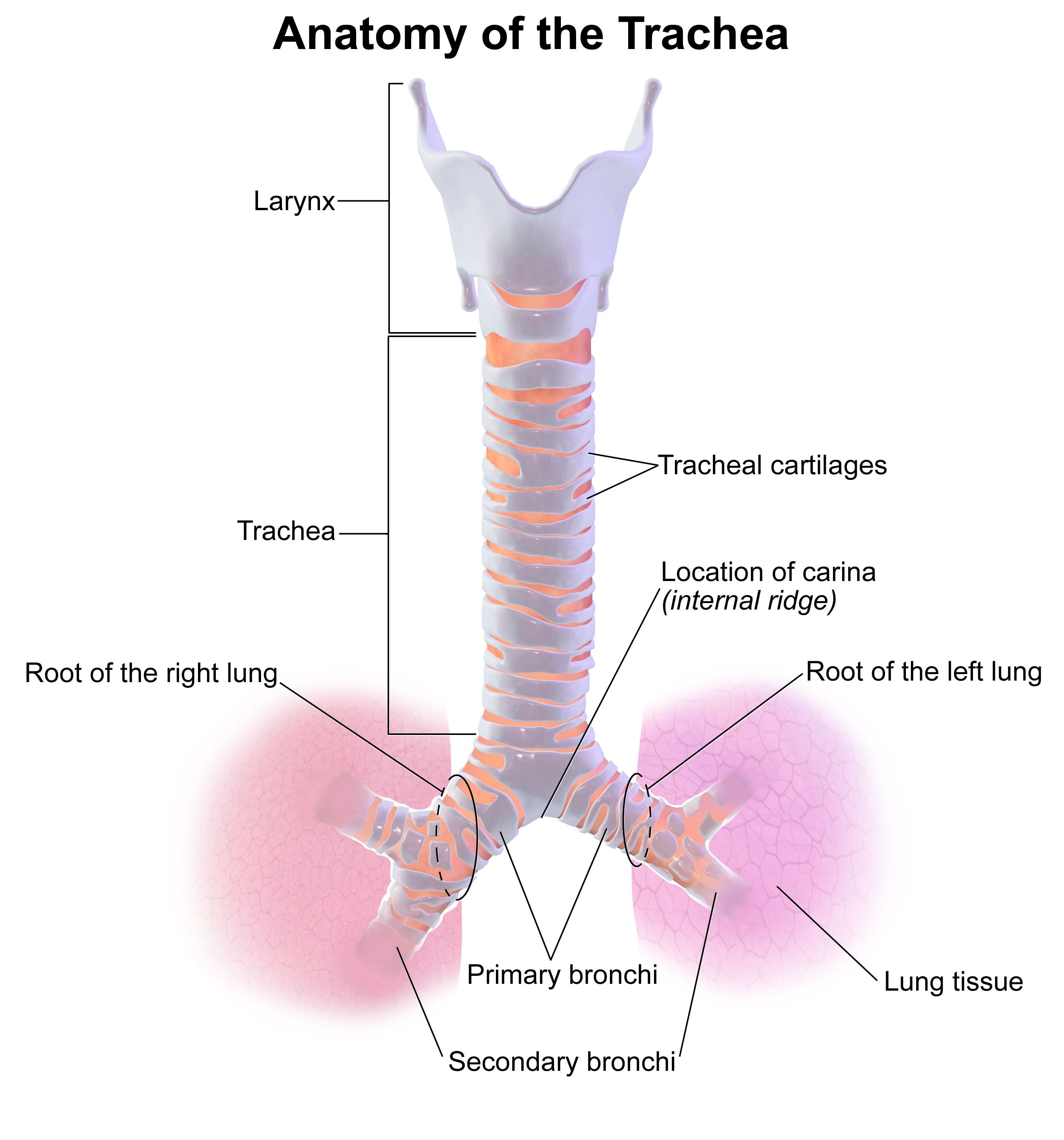
- Anatomy of the trachea
- Specialty: Pulmonology

Tracheitis is an inflammation of the trachea. Although the trachea is usually considered part of the lower respiratory tract, in ICD-10 tracheitis is classified under "acute upper respiratory infections".

== Symptoms ==
- Increasing deep or barking croup cough following a recent upper respiratory infection
- Crowing sound when inhaling (inspiratory stridor)
- 'Scratchy' feeling in the throat
- Chest pain
- Fever
- Ear ache
- Headache
- Dizziness (light headed)
- Labored breathing

== Causes ==
Bacterial tracheitis is a bacterial infection of the trachea and is capable of producing airway obstruction.

One of the most common causes is Staphylococcus aureus and often follows a recent viral upper respiratory infection. Bacterial tracheitis is a rare complication of influenza infection. It is the most serious in young children, possibly because of the relatively small size of the trachea that gets easily blocked by swelling. The most frequent sign is the rapid development of stridor. It is occasionally confused with croup. If it is inflamed, a condition known as tracheitis can occur. In this condition there can be inflammation of the linings of the trachea. A condition called tracheo-bronchitis can be caused, when the mucous membrane of the trachea and bronchi swell. A collapsed trachea is formed as a result of defect in the cartilage, that makes the cartilage unable to support the trachea and results in dry hacking cough. In this condition there can be inflammation of the linings of the trachea. If the connective nerve tissues in the trachea degenerate it causes tracheomalacia. Infections to the trachea can cause tracheomegaly.

== Diagnosis ==
The diagnosis of tracheitis requires the direct vision of exudates or pseudomembranes on the trachea. X-ray findings may include subglottic narrowing. The priority is to secure the patient's airway, and to rule out croup and epiglottitis which may be fatal. Suspicion for tracheitis should be high in cases of onset of airway obstruction that do not respond to racemic epinephrine.

== Treatment ==
In more severe cases, it is treated by administering intravenous antibiotics and may require admission to an intensive care unit (ICU) for intubation and supportive ventilation if the airway swelling is severe. During an intensive care admission, various methods of invasive and non-invasive monitoring may be required, which may include ECG monitoring, oxygen saturation, capnography and arterial blood pressure monitoring.
