= Subglottis =

Part of the larynx

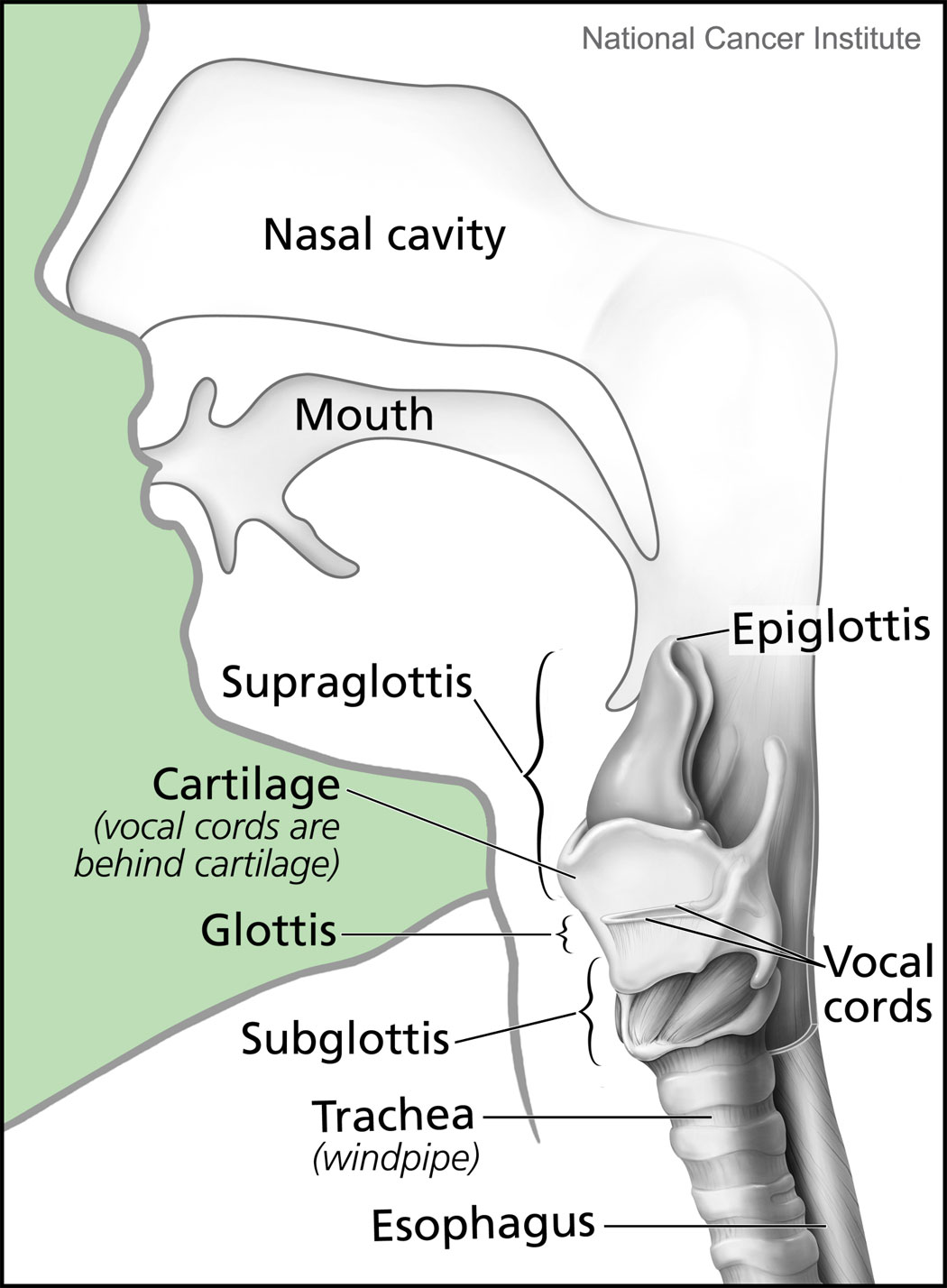
This diagram shows the location of the subglottic region in the throat

The subglottis or subglottic region is the lower portion of the larynx, extending from just beneath the vocal cords down to the top of the trachea. The structures in the subglottis are involved in the regulation of the temperature of the breath. Narrowing of the subglottis is known as subglottic stenosis and may require a tracheotomy to correct.
