= Pyriform sinus =

Fossa involved in speech

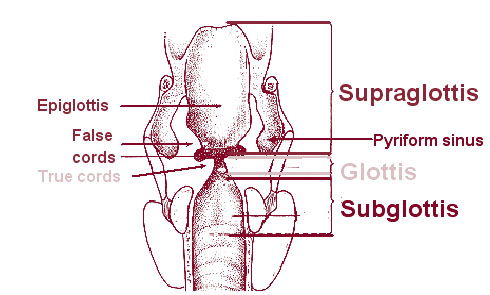
- Pyriform sinus, a part of hypopharynx

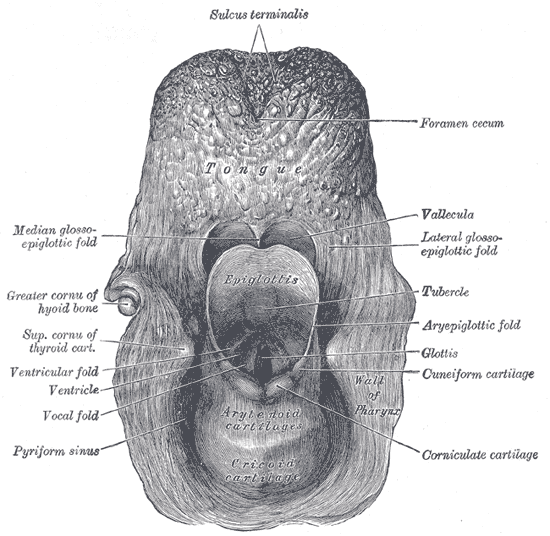
- The entrance to the larynx, viewed from behind, with Pyriform sinus labeled at bottom left.

Details

Identifiers
- Latin: recessus piriformis, sinus piriformis
- MeSH: D056144
- TA98: A05.3.01.024
- TA2: 2880
- FMA: 55067

The pyriform sinus (also piriform recess, piriform sinus, piriform fossa, or smuggler's fossa) is a small recess on either side of the laryngeal inlet. It is bounded medially by the aryepiglottic fold, and laterally by the thyroid cartilage and thyrohyoid membrane. The fossae are involved in speech.

== Etymology ==
The term "pyriform," which means "pear-shaped," is also sometimes spelled "piriform".

The term smuggler's fossa comes from its use for smuggling of small items.

== Structure ==
=== Relations ===
Deep to the mucous membrane of the pyriform fossa lie the recurrent laryngeal nerve as well as the internal laryngeal nerve, a branch of the superior laryngeal nerve. The internal laryngeal nerve supplies sensation to the area, and it may become damaged if the mucous membrane is inadvertently punctured. The pyriform sinus is a subsite of the hypopharynx. This distinction is important for head and neck cancer staging and treatment.

== Clinical significance ==
This sinus is a common place for food particles to become trapped; if foreign material becomes lodged in the piriform fossa of an infant, it may be retrieved nonsurgically. If the area is injured (e.g., by a fish bone), it can give the sensation of food stuck in the subject's throat.

Remnants of the pharyngeal pouches III and IV may extend to the piriform sinus as sinus tracts which are sometimes imprecisely called "fistulas". This can result in acute infectious thyroiditis which is more common on the left side of the neck.
