= Thyrohyoid ligament =

Thyrohyoid ligament can refer to:

- Lateral thyrohyoid ligament
- Median thyrohyoid ligament
