= Cricothyroid =

Cricothyroid may refer to:

- Cricothyroid muscle
- Cricothyroid ligament
