= Respiratory arrest =

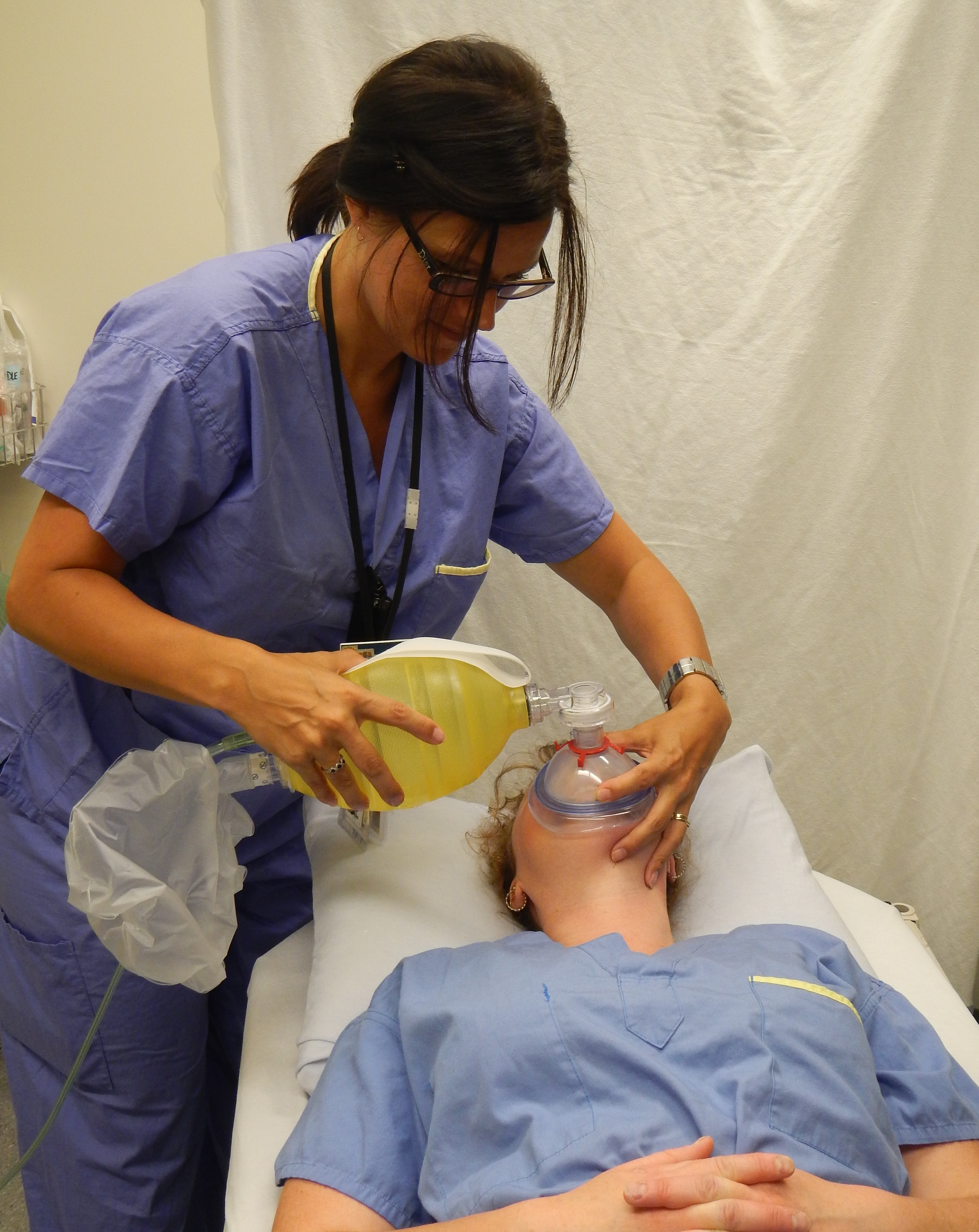
- A healthcare provider demonstrating manual ventilation via bag-valve mask on a colleague
- Specialty: Emergency Medicine, Pulmonology
- Symptoms: Decreased level or total loss of consciousness, no breathing
- Complications: Coma, persistent vegetative state, cardiac arrest, respiratory failure, death

Respiratory arrest is a serious medical condition caused by apnea or respiratory dysfunction severe enough that it will not sustain the body (such as agonal breathing). Prolonged apnea refers to a patient who has stopped breathing for a long period of time. If the heart muscle contraction is intact, the condition is known as respiratory arrest. An abrupt stop of pulmonary gas exchange lasting for more than five minutes may permanently damage vital organs, especially the brain. Lack of oxygen to the brain causes loss of consciousness. Brain injury is likely if respiratory arrest goes untreated for more than three minutes, and death is almost certain if more than five minutes.

Damage may be reversible if treated early enough. Respiratory arrest is a life-threatening medical emergency that requires immediate medical attention and management. To save a patient in respiratory arrest, the goal is to restore adequate ventilation and prevent further damage. Management interventions include supplying oxygen, opening the airway, and means of artificial ventilation. In some instances, an impending respiratory arrest could be predetermined by signs the patient is showing, such as the increased work of breathing. Respiratory arrest will ensue once the patient depletes their oxygen reserves and loses the effort to breathe.

Respiratory arrest should be distinguished from respiratory failure. The former refers to the complete cessation of breathing, while respiratory failure is the inability to provide adequate ventilation for the body's requirements. Without intervention, both may lead to decreased oxygen in the blood (hypoxemia), elevated carbon dioxide level in the blood (hypercapnia), inadequate oxygen perfusion to tissue (hypoxia), and may be fatal. Respiratory arrest is also different from cardiac arrest, the failure of heart muscle contraction. If untreated, one may lead to the other.

== Signs and symptoms ==
One common sign of respiratory arrest is cyanosis, a bluish discoloration of the skin resulting from an inadequate amount of oxygen in the blood. If respiratory arrest remains without any treatment, cardiac arrest will occur within minutes of hypoxemia, hypercapnia or both. At this point, patients will be unconscious or about to become unconscious.

Signs and symptoms of respiratory compromise can differ with each patient. Complications from respiratory compromise are increasing rapidly across the clinical spectrum, partly due to expanded use of opioids combined with the lack of standardized guidelines among medical specialties. While respiratory compromise creates problems that are often serious and potentially life-threatening, they may be prevented with the proper tools and approach. Appropriate patient monitoring and therapeutic strategies are necessary for early recognition, intervention and treatment.

== Causes ==
- Airway obstruction: Obstruction may occur in the upper and lower airway.
  - Upper airway: Obstruction of the upper airway is common in infants less than 3 months old because they are nose breathers. Nasal blockage may easily lead to upper airway obstruction in infants. For other ages, upper airway obstruction may occur from a foreign body or edema of the pharynx, larynx, or trachea. In cases of decreased or total loss of consciousness, the tongue can lose muscle tone and obstruct the upper airway. Other potential causes of obstruction include tumors of the upper respiratory tract (oral cavity, pharynx, larynx), bodily fluids (blood, mucus, vomit), and trauma to the upper airway. The most common type of tumor of upper respiratory tract is squamous cell carcinoma, with the greatest risk factors for this condition being alcohol and tobacco use, with HPV (genotype 16) being another important risk factor. An epidemiological study of over 5 million cases of head and neck trauma in the United States resulting in visits to the emergency department found that the majority occur due to falls or blunt force, with foreign body injuries being more common in the pediatric population.
  - Lower airway: may occur from bronchospasm, drowning, or airspace filling disorders (e.g. pneumonia, pulmonary edema, pulmonary hemorrhage). Obstructive conditions of the lower airway, including severe asthma or COPD episodes, can also lead to respiratory arrest. During these episodes, known as exacerbations, airway resistance is increased due to inflammatory changes in the lungs. This leads to increased work of breathing and decreased oxygen delivery to tissue. In asthma, this involves bronchiolar constriction whereas in COPD this involves small airway collapse during expiration and subsequent air-trapping. One of the ways the body attempts to compensate for these increased respiratory demands is by increasing respiratory rate, which in turn worsens respiratory muscle fatigue of the diaphragm and can eventually lead to respiratory arrest and death without timely medical intervention.
- Decreased respiratory effort: Central nervous system impairment leads to decreased respiratory effort. The respiratory center of the brain is located in the pons and medulla and is primarily driven by elevated carbon dioxide levels in the blood (hypercapnia) with decreased oxygen levels (hypoxemia) serving as a less potent stimulus. Central nervous system disorders, such as stroke and tumors, may cause hypoventilation. Drugs may decrease respiratory effort as well, such as opioids, sedative-hypnotics, and alcohol. These lower respiratory drive by blunting the response of the respiratory center of the brain to hypercapnia. Metabolic disorders could also decrease respiratory effort. Hypoglycemia and hypotension depress the central nervous system and compromise the respiratory system.
- Respiratory muscle weakness: Neuromuscular disorders may lead to respiratory muscle weakness, such as spinal cord injury, neuromuscular diseases, and neuromuscular blocking drugs. Respiratory muscle fatigue can also lead to respiratory muscle weakness if patients breathe over 70% of their maximum voluntary ventilation. Breathing over an extended period of time near maximum capacity can cause metabolic acidosis or hypoxemia, ultimately leading to respiratory muscle weakness.
- Cardiac arrest (independent of the underlying reason) will lead to respiratory arrest within minutes.

== Diagnosis ==
Diagnosis requires clinical evaluation, as detailed below.

=== Initial assessment ===
After determining the scene is safe, approach the patient and attempt to converse with him or her. If the patient responds verbally, you have established that there is at least a partially patent airway and that the patient is breathing (therefore not currently in respiratory arrest). If the patient is unresponsive, look for chest rise, which is an indicator of active breathing. A sternal rub is sometimes used to further assess for responsiveness. Initial assessment also involves checking for a pulse, by placing two fingers against the carotid artery, radial artery, or femoral artery to ensure this is purely respiratory arrest and not cardiopulmonary arrest. Checking a pulse after encountering an unresponsive patient is no longer recommended for non-medically trained personnel. Once one has determined that the patient is in respiratory arrest, the steps below can help to further identify the cause of the arrest.

=== Clearing and opening the upper airway ===
The first step to determining the cause of arrest is to clear and open the upper airway with correct head and neck positioning. The practitioner must lengthen and elevate the patient's neck until the external auditory meatus is in the same plane as the sternum. The face should be facing the ceiling. The mandible should be positioned upwards by lifting the lower jaw and pushing the mandible upward. These steps are known as head tilt, chin lift, and jaw thrust, respectively. If a neck or spinal injury is suspected, the provider should avoid performing this maneuver as further nervous system damage may occur. The cervical spine should be stabilized, if possible, by using either manual stabilization of the head and neck by a provider or applying a C-collar. The C-collar can make ventilatory support more challenging and can increase intracranial pressure, therefore is less preferable than manual stabilization. If a foreign body can be detected, the practitioner may remove it with a finger sweep of the oropharynx and suction. It is important that the practitioner does not cause the foreign body to be lodged even deeper into the patient's body. Foreign bodies that are deeper into the patient's body can be removed with Magill forceps or by suction. A Heimlich maneuver can also be used to dislodge the foreign body. The Heimlich maneuver consists of manual thrusts to the upper abdomen until the airway is clear. In conscious adults, the practitioner will stand behind the patient with arms around the patient's midsection. One fist will be in a clenched formation while the other hand grabs the fist. Together, both hands will thrust inward and upward by pulling up with both arms.

== Treatment ==
Treatment varies depending on the cause of respiratory arrest. In many cases, it is necessary to establish an alternate airway and providing artificial ventilation that can include modes of mechanical ventilation. There are many ways to provide an airway and to deliver breathing support. The list below includes several options.

=== Opioid-overdose ===
Opioid overdose remains a major cause of death with an increase in rate of death by 12% in the United States from 2016 to 2017. In cases of overdose leading to respiratory arrest, the recommended treatment according to the 2015 American Heart Association guidelines is to administer intramuscular or intranasal naloxone at an initial dose of 0.04-0.4 mg. Dosing may be repeated up to 2 mg if initial dose is ineffective. Special consideration must be taken in individuals with opioid dependency as naloxone administration can induce severe opioid withdrawal, hence the recommended starting doses above. Goal of naloxone therapy is to restore respiratory drive in the individual, however mechanical ventilation may still be necessary during initial resuscitation.

=== Bag-valve-mask (BVM) ventilation devices ===
Resistance to bag valve mask may suggest presence of a foreign body that is obstructing airways and commonly used as a diagnostic tool and treatment for respiratory arrest. The bag-valve-mask device has a self-inflating bag with a soft mask that rests on the face. When the bag is connected to an oxygen supply, the patient will receive 60 to 100% of inspired oxygen. The purpose of bag-valve-mask is to provide adequate temporary ventilation and allow the body to achieve airway control by itself. However, if the bag-valve-mask is left on for more than five minutes, air may be introduced into the stomach. At that point, a nasogastric tube should be inserted to take the accumulated air out. During this process, practitioners must carefully position and maneuver the bag-valve-mask in order to keep airways open. To ensure an adequate seal when using the bag valve mask to ventilate, specific hand positioning is typically used. The provider places his or her thumb and index finger in a 'C' shape on top of the mask and grips the jaw under the mask with the other three fingers, creating an 'E' shape. The thumb and index finger provide downward pressure on the mask while the remaining fingers maintain head tilt and jaw thrust. The free hand can then be used to provide ventilation via the bag. For children, pediatric bags can be used. Pediatric bags have a valve that limits peak airway pressures to around 35–40 cm of water. Practitioners must tweak valve settings to accurately determine each of their patients to avoid hypoventilation or hyperventilation. When applying ventilation with the bag valve mask, the provider should apply just enough pressure to bag to see a chest rise. Providing excessive bag pressure can actually impair the blood flow to the heart and brain, so during CPR extra caution should be taken to limit size of tidal volume. The rate of manual ventilation should not exceed 12 times per minute, or one ventilation every 5 seconds as to avoid hyperventilation.

=== Airway patency devices ===
An oropharyngeal or nasopharyngeal airway is used during bag-valve-mask ventilation to prevent soft tissues from blocking the airway. An oropharyngeal airway may cause gagging and vomiting. Therefore, an oropharyngeal airway must be sized appropriately. An airway that is incorrectly sized can worsen the airway obstruction. The distance measured should be from the corner of the patient's mouth to the angle of the jaw or earlobe.

=== Laryngeal mask airways ===
The laryngeal mask airway (LMA) is a tube with an inflatable cuff. A laryngeal mask airway can be positioned in the lower oropharynx to prevent airway obstruction by soft tissues and to create a safe channel for ventilation. The laryngeal mask airway is the standard rescue ventilation when endotracheal intubation cannot be accomplished. To insert the laryngeal mask airway into the patient, the deflated mask should be pressed against the hard palate, rotated past the base of the tongue, and reaching the pharynx. Once the mask has been placed in the correct position, the mask can be inflated. Some benefits of the laryngeal mask airway include minimization of gastric inflation and protection against regurgitation. A potential problem the laryngeal mask airway poses is that over inflation will make the mask more rigid and less able to adapt to the patient's anatomy, compressing the tongue and causing tongue edema. In that case, the mask pressure should be lowered or a larger mask size should be used. If non-comatose patients are given muscle relaxants before the insertion of the laryngeal mask airway, they may gag and aspirate when the drugs are worn off. At that point, the laryngeal mask airway should be removed immediately to eliminate the gag response and buy time to start at new alternative intubation technique.

=== Endotracheal intubation ===
A tracheal tube is inserted into the trachea through the mouth or nose. Endotracheal tubes contain high-volume, low-pressure balloon cuffs to minimize air leakage and the risk of aspiration. Cuffed tubes were made originally for adults and children over 8 years old, but cuffed tubes have been used in infants and younger children to prevent air leakage. Cuffed tubes can be inflated to the extent needed to prevent air leakage. The endotracheal tube is a guaranteed mechanism to secure a compromised airway, limit aspiration, and bring about mechanical ventilation in comatose patients. The endotracheal tube is a great method for patients who are comatose, have an obstructed airway, or need mechanical ventilation. The endotracheal tube also allows suctioning of the lower respiratory tract. Drugs that can be inserted through the endotracheal tube during cardiac arrest are discouraged. Before intubation, patients need correct patient positioning and ventilation with 100% oxygen. The purpose of ventilation with 100% oxygen is to denitrogenate healthy patients and prolong the safe apneic time. Tubes with an internal diameter of over 8mm are acceptable for most adults. Insertion technique includes visualizing the epiglottis, the posterior laryngeal structure, and not passing the tube unless tracheal insertion is ensured.

=== Surgical airway ===
Surgical entry is required when the upper airway is obstructed by a foreign body, massive trauma has occurred, or if ventilation cannot be accomplished by any of the aforementioned methods. The requirement of the surgical airway is commonly known as the response to failed intubation. In comparison, surgical airways require 100 seconds to complete from incision to ventilation compared to laryngeal mask airways and other devices. During emergency cricothyrotomy, the patient lies on their back with neck extended and shoulders backward. The larynx is held in one hand by the practitioner while the other hand is holding a blade to incise the skin through the subcutaneous tissue and into the midline of the cricothyroid membrane to access the trachea. A hollow tube is used inserted into the trachea to keep the airway open. A tracheal hook is used to keep the space open and prevent retraction. Complications may include hemorrhage, subcutaneous emphysema, pneumomediastinum, and pneumothorax. Cricothyrotomy is used as emergency surgical access due to being fast and simple. Another surgical airway method is called tracheostomy. Tracheostomy is done in the operating room by a surgeon. This is the preferred method for patients requiring long-term ventilation. Tracheostomy uses skin puncture and dilators to insert the tracheostomy tube.

=== Drugs to aid intubation ===
Patients with respiratory arrest can be intubated without drugs. However, patients can be given sedating and paralytic drugs to minimize discomfort and help out with intubation. Pretreatment includes 100% oxygen, lidocaine, and atropine. 100% oxygen should be administered for 3 to 5 minutes. The time depends on pulse rate, pulmonary function, RBC count, and other metabolic factors. Lidocaine can be given in 1.5 mg/kg IV a few minutes before sedation and paralysis. The purpose of administering lidocaine is to blunt the sympathetic response of an increased heart rate, blood pressure, and intracranial pressure caused by laryngoscopy. Atropine can be given when children produce a vagal response, evidenced by bradycardia, in response to intubation. Some physicians even give out vecuronium, which is a neuromuscular blocker to prevent muscle fasciculations in patients over 4 years old. Fasciculations may result in muscle pain on awakening. Laryngoscopy and intubation are uncomfortable procedures, so etomidate may be delivered. Etomidate is a short-acting IV drug with sedative analgesic properties. The drug works well and does not cause cardiovascular depression. Ketamine is an anesthetic that may be used as well, but it may cause hallucinations or bizarre behavior upon awakening. Thiopental and methohexital may be used as well to provide sedation, but they tend to cause hypotension.

=== Volume-cycled ventilation ===
The purpose of mechanical ventilators is to deliver a constant volume, constant pressure, or a combination of both with each breath. Any given volume will correspond to a specific pressure on the pressure-volume curve and vice versa in any case. Settings on each mechanical ventilator may include respiratory rate, tidal volume, trigger sensitivity, flow rate, waveform, and inspiratory/expiratory ratio. The volume-cycled ventilation includes the volume-control function and delivers a set tidal volume. The pressure is not a fixed number but it varies with resistance and capacitance of the respiratory system. The volume-cycled ventilation is the simplest and most efficient of providing ventilation to a patient's airway compared to other methods of mechanical ventilation. Each inspiratory effort that is beyond the set sensitivity threshold will be accounted for and fixed to the delivery of the corresponding tidal volume. If the patient does not breathe enough, then the volume-cycled ventilation will initiate a breath for the patient to bring up the breathing rate to the minimum respiratory rate. The synchronized intermittent mandatory ventilation (SIMV) is a similar method of mechanical ventilation that also delivers breaths at a fixed rate and volume that corresponds to the patient's breathing. Unlike the Volume-Cycled Ventilation, patient efforts above the fixed rate are unassisted in the synchronized intermittent mandatory ventilation (SIMV).

=== Pressure-cycled ventilation ===
The pressure-cycled ventilation includes pressure control ventilation and pressure support ventilation. Both methods offer a set inspiratory pressure. The tidal volume varies depending on the resistance and elastance of the respiratory system. Pressure-cycled ventilation can help alleviate symptoms in patients with acute respiratory distress syndrome by limiting the distending pressure of the lungs. The pressure control ventilation is specifically a pressure-cycled form of assist-control ventilators. Assist-control ventilators describe a mode of ventilation that maintains a minimum respiratory rate regardless of whether or not the patient initiates a spontaneous breath. Each inspiratory effort that is beyond the sensitivity threshold delivers full pressures support for a fixed inspiratory time. There is maintenance of a minimum respiratory rate. In the pressure support ventilation, the minimum rate is not set. Instead, all breaths are triggered by the patient. The way that the pressure support ventilation works is by assisting the patient with a constant pressure until the patient's inspiratory flow falls below a threshold. The longer, deeper inspiratory flows by the patient will result in a larger tidal volume. This method of mechanical ventilation will help patients assume more work of breathing.

=== Noninvasive positive pressure ventilation (NIPPV) ===
Noninvasive positive pressure ventilation is the delivery of positive pressure ventilation through a tight-fitting mask that covers the nose and mouth. It assists patients who can spontaneously breathe. Noninvasive positive pressure ventilation delivers end-expiratory pressure with a volume control setting. There are two ways that noninvasive positive pressure ventilation can be delivered: continuous positive airway pressure or bilevel positive airway pressure. In continuous positive airway pressure, constant pressure is maintained throughout cycles of respiration with no additional inspiratory support. In bilevel positive airway pressure, both expiratory positive airway pressure and inspiratory positive airway pressure are set by the physician. Noninvasive positive pressure ventilation should not be administered to people who are hemodynamically unstable, gastric emptying impaired, bowel obstructed or pregnant. In these circumstances, swallowing large amounts of air will result in vomiting and possibly death. If frequent arrhythmias, myocardial ischemia and shock arrhythmias occur, practitioners should change delivery to endotracheal intubation or conventional mechanical ventilation. People who should not use noninvasive positive pressure ventilation include obtunded patients or ones with secretions. Noninvasive positive pressure ventilation can be used in an outpatient setting for patients with obstructive sleep apnea.

== See also ==
- Crash cart
- Respiratory failure
