= Surgical airway management =

- In cricothyrotomy, the incision or puncture is made through the cricothyroid membrane in between the thyroid cartilage and the cricoid cartilage
- ICD-9-CM: 31.1-31.3

Surgical airway management (bronchotomy) is the medical procedure ensuring an open airway between a patient's lungs and the outside world. Surgical methods for airway management rely on making a surgical incision below the glottis in order to achieve direct access to the lower respiratory tract, bypassing the upper respiratory tract. Surgical airway management is often performed as a last resort in cases where orotracheal and nasotracheal intubation are impossible or contraindicated. Surgical airway management is also used when a person will need a mechanical ventilator for a longer period. The surgical creation of a permanent opening in the larynx is referred to as laryngostomy. Surgical airway management is a primary consideration in anaesthesia, emergency medicine and intensive care medicine.

Surgical methods for airway management include cricothyrotomy and tracheostomy

== History ==
Asclepiades of Bithynia is credited with being the first person who proposed bronchotomy as a surgical procedure, though he never attempted to perform one. Aretaeus of Cappadocia thought the procedure dangerous even as a remedy for choking, since the resulting incision "would not heal, as being cartilaginous"; Caelius Aurelianus also rejected its usefulness.

== Cricothyrotomy ==
A cricothyrotomy is an incision made through the skin and cricothyroid membrane to establish a patent airway during certain life-threatening situations, such as airway obstruction by a foreign body, angioedema, or massive facial trauma. A cricothyrotomy is nearly always performed as a last resort in cases where orotracheal and nasotracheal intubation are impossible or contraindicated. Cricothyrotomy is easier and quicker to perform than tracheotomy, does not require manipulation of the cervical spine and is associated with fewer complications.

== Needle cricothyrotomy ==
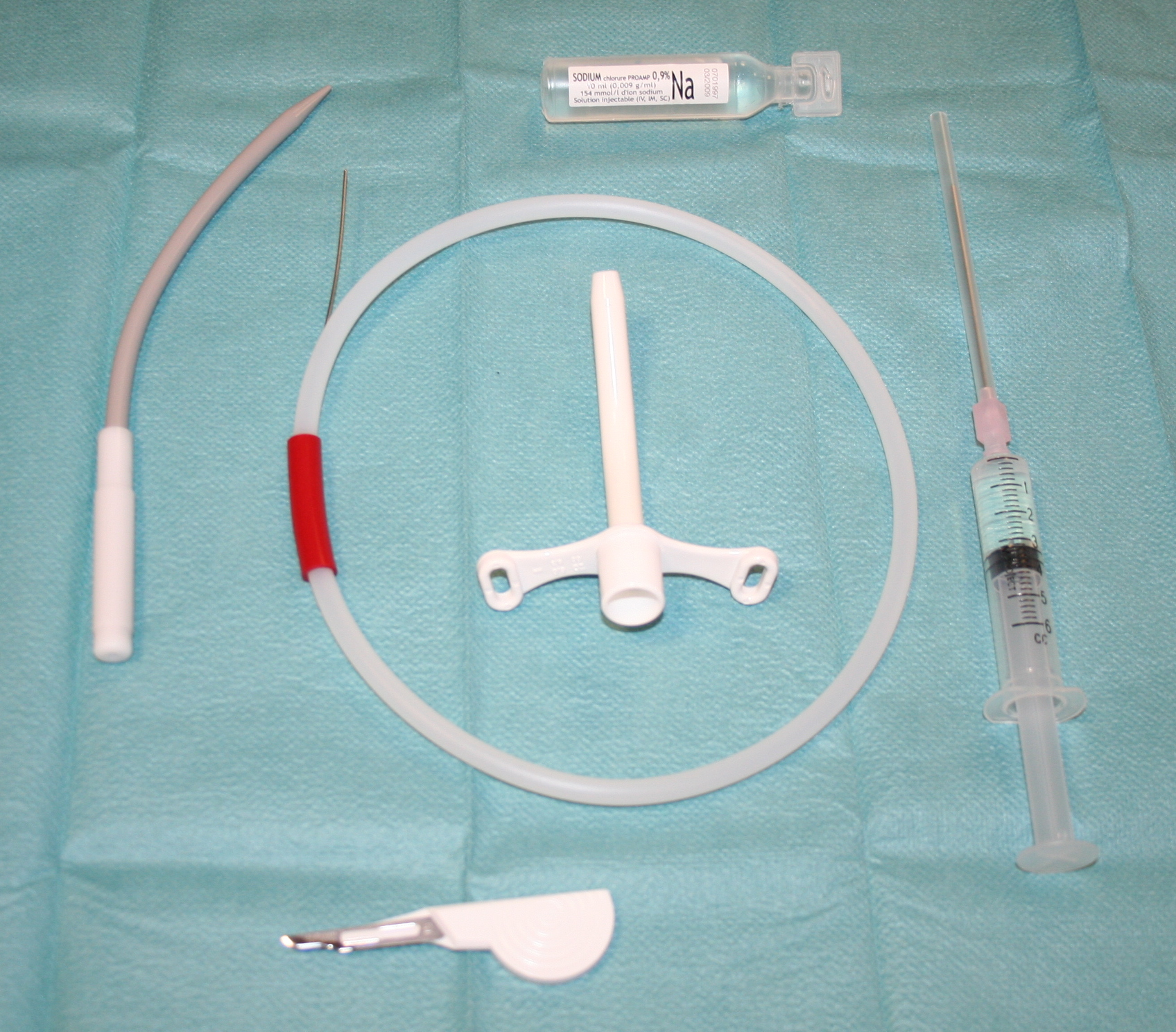
Cricothyrotomy kit

A needle cricothyrotomy is similar to a cricothyrotomy, but instead of making a scalpel incision, a large over-the-needle catheter is inserted (10- to 14-gauge). This is considerably simpler, particularly if using specially designed kits. This technique provides very limited airflow. The delivery of oxygen to the lungs through an over-the-needle catheter inserted through the skin into the trachea using a high pressure gas source is considered a form of conventional ventilation called percutaneous transtracheal ventilation (PTV).

== Tracheotomy ==
A tracheotomy is a surgically created opening from the skin of the neck down to the trachea. A tracheotomy may be considered where a person will need to be on a mechanical ventilator for a longer period. The advantages of a tracheotomy include less risk of infection and damage to the trachea such as tracheal stenosis.

== See also ==
- Airway management
- Invasive airway management
- Thyrotomy
- List of surgeries by type
