= Thyroidectomy =

Surgical procedure involving partial or complete removal of the thyroid

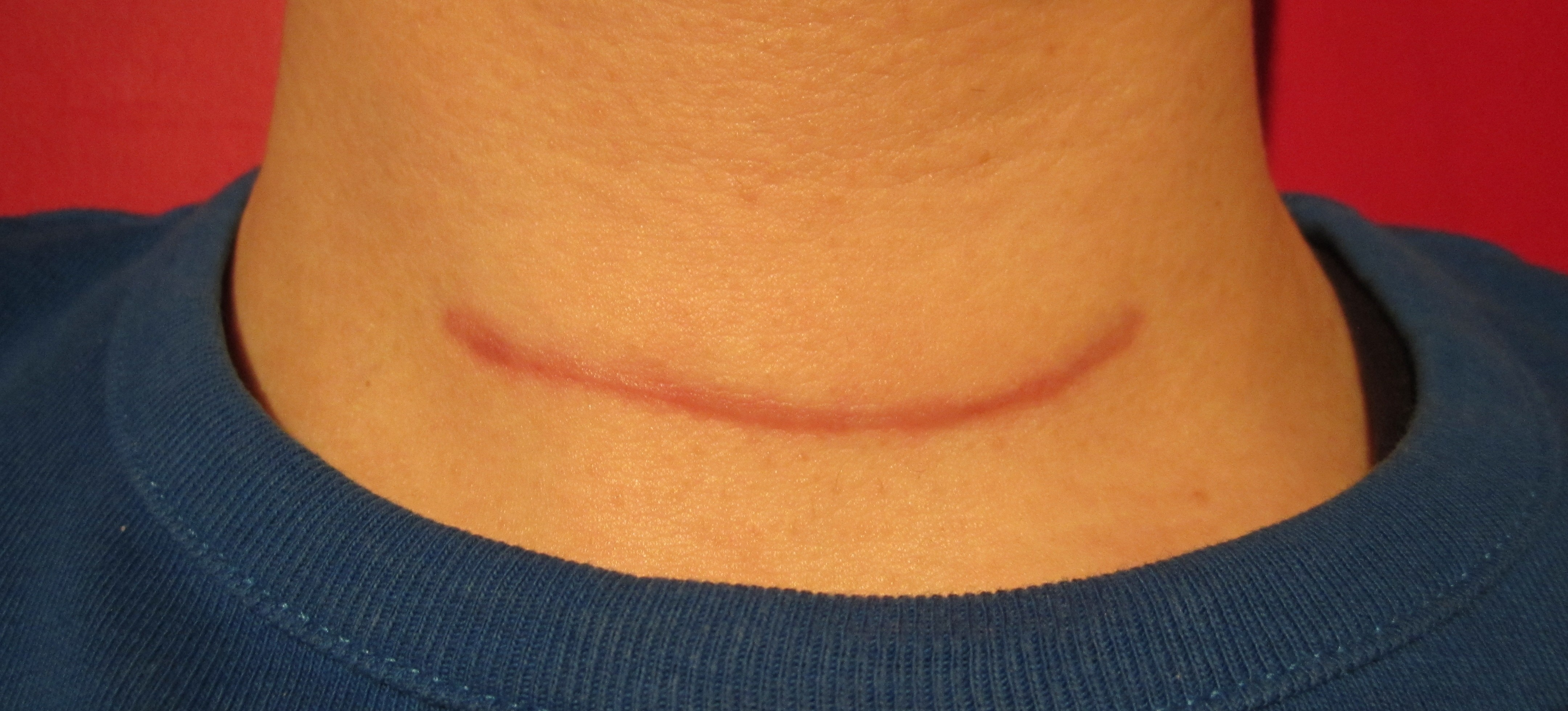
- Scar following open thyroid surgery
- Specialty: General surgery, endocrine surgery, head and neck surgery
- ICD-9-CM: 06.3-06.5
- MeSH: D013965

A thyroidectomy is an operation that involves the surgical removal of all or part of the thyroid gland. In general surgery, endocrine or head and neck surgeons often perform a thyroidectomy when a patient has thyroid cancer or some other condition of the thyroid gland, such as hyperthyroidism or goiter. Less common indications for surgery include cosmetic concerns or airway obstruction related to significant enlargement of the thyroid. Post-operative complications or sequelae may involve temporary or permanent change in voice, temporary or permanent hypocalcemia, the need for lifelong thyroid hormone replacement, bleeding, infection, and the remote possibility of airway obstruction due to bilateral vocal cord paralysis.

The first confirmed thyroidectomy was performed by Al-Zahrawi in 952 AD. Today, thyroidectomy is a common procedure with over 100,000 operations per year in the United States alone. Traditionally, the diseased portion of the thyroid has been removed through a neck incision that leaves a permanent scar. More recently, minimally invasive and "scarless" approaches, such as the trans-axillary approach (TAA), have offered better cosmetic outcomes and lower risk of complication.

== Indications ==
Thyroidectomy may be used in the treatment of benign and malignant conditions of the thyroid gland. These include:

- Thyroid nodules, the most common indication for thyroidectomy
- Hyperthyroidism due to toxic adenoma, toxic multinodular goiter (MNG), or Graves' disease, especially if exophthalmos is present
- Hashimoto's (autoimmune) thyroiditis, though controversial due to high risk of complication
- Symptomatic goiter, causing dysphagia, dyspnea, or chronic cough due to compression of surrounding structures by the enlarged gland
- Primary thyroid malignancies, such as papillary thyroid, follicular thyroid, and anaplastic thyroid cancer
- Metastatic disease to the thyroid

== Procedure and management ==
=== Pre-operative preparation ===
Pre-operative management for a thyroidectomy revolves around reducing risk for post-operative complications. The main priority involves normalizing thyroid hormone levels and managing symptoms prior to moving forward with the operation. For patients with too much thyroid hormone (hyperthyroidism), this can be achieved with the use of antithyroid medications like methimazole or propylthiouracil. Meanwhile, symptoms of hyperthyroidism, such as tachycardia can be controlled with non-selective beta-blockers. Some surgeons may also prescribe iodine solutions like Lugol's iodine or potassium iodide, which help inhibit the production of excess thyroid hormone through a phenomenon known as the Wolff–Chaikoff effect. These practices may help prevent the feared thyrotoxicosis or thyroid storm that may occur during or following surgery in hyperthyroid patients. To help prevent the relatively frequent complication of hypoparathyroidism, surgeons may also administer calcium and/or calcitriol (Vitamin D) prior to the operation. Patients with existing vocal cord dysfunction may undergo additional preoperative evaluation via laryngoscopy for surgical planning purposes.

=== Operation ===
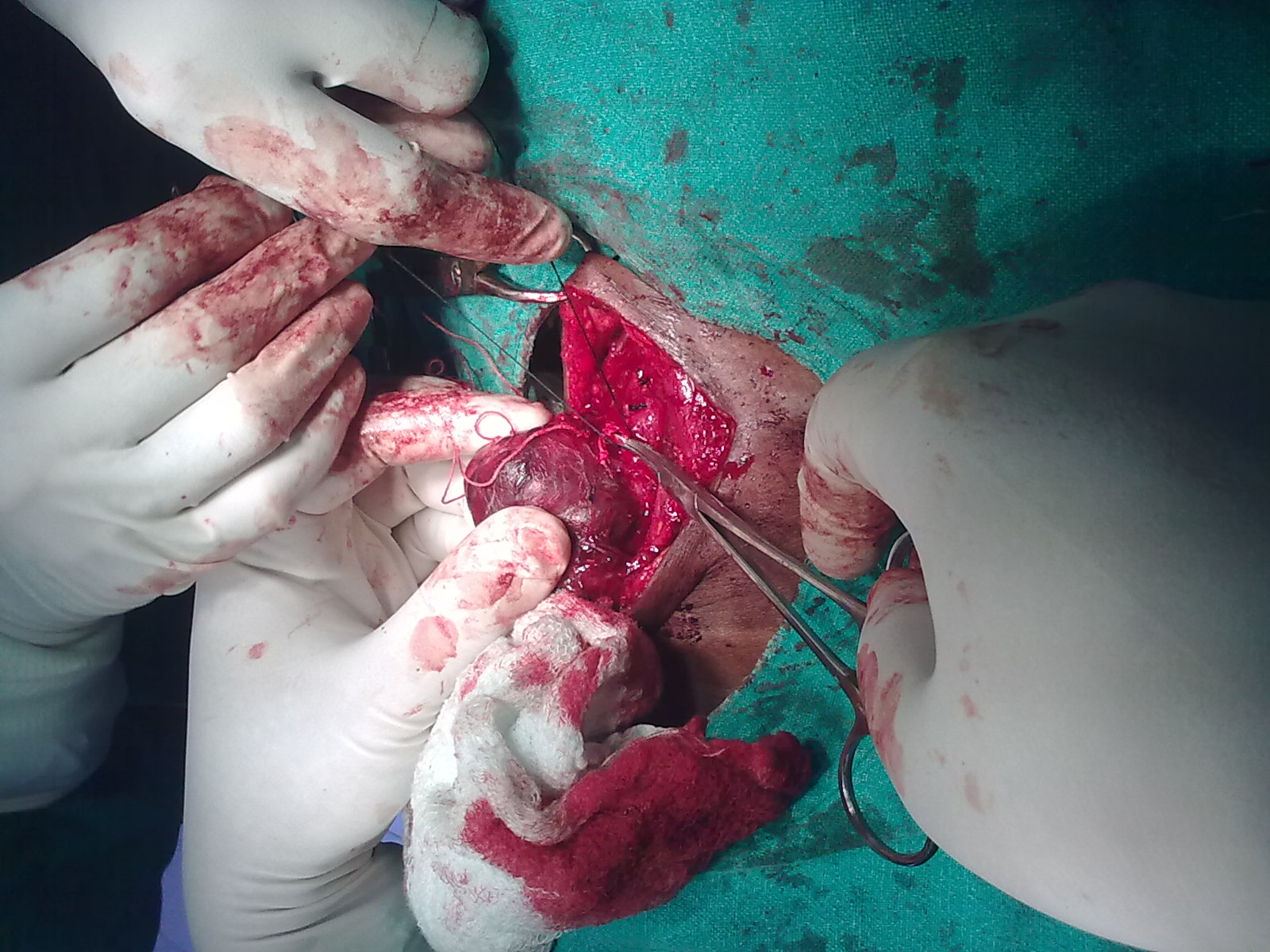
Open thyroidectomy (OT)

While surgeons may adapt their approach based on the pathology, amount of tissue to be removed, and specific patient anatomy, the classic open thyroidectomy (OT) generally follows a similar sequence of events. The surgeon first makes a transverse (horizontal) incision through the skin in the front of the neck and dissects through subcutaneous tissue and muscle until the thyroid gland is exposed. The thyroid lobes are then retracted to expose vascular supply, which is ligated to help release the gland. During this process, the surgeon identifies and takes special care to avoid important nearby structures, such as the jugular veins, superior laryngeal nerve, recurrent laryngeal nerve, and parathyroid glands. Finally, the specimen is carefully removed from the underlying trachea before the skin is closed and dressed.

==== Trans-axillary approach (TAA) ====
Following an OT, patients will likely have a small but visible scar on the front of the neck, which can be unsatisfactory for some. As a result, Japanese surgeons developed the trans-axillary approach to thyroidectomy. This is an endoscopic method, which involves the creation small incisions (port sites) in the axillae on either side of the patient. The surgeon will then blow CO_{2} gas into the body to create space to work, a process termed "insufflation". He is then able to insert cameras and other endoscopic instruments through these incisions to access the thyroid. This approach leaves the patient with a small scar in the axilla that is covered when the arm is in a natural position, eliminating the cosmetic drawback of OT.

Over time, endoscopic variations have arisen to provide better operative visualization and reduce complication risk. Instead of working on one side of the patient at a time, the bilateral axillo-breast approach (BABA) involves inserting ports in both axillae and beneath both areolas simultaneously to provide a symmetrical view of the thyroid throughout the procedure. As mentioned previously, CO_{2} gas is utilized for endoscopic approaches and, while the gas is usually absorbed by the body during recovery, it can occasionally cause subcutaneous emphysema and/or pneumothorax. To minimize this risk, gasless approaches have been developed that use a special tool for visualization instead of gas.

==== TOETVA ====
Another remote-access technique is the transoral endoscopic thyroidectomy vestibular approach (TOETVA), in which the thyroid is removed through small incisions inside the lower lip, leaving no scar on the neck. It was reported by Angkoon Anuwong in a 2016 case series in the World Journal of Surgery, and a 2018 comparative study in JAMA Surgery reported that it could be performed as safely as conventional open thyroidectomy while avoiding a neck scar.

=== Post-operative management ===
For the majority of patients, a thyroidectomy is an outpatient procedure, meaning they are discharged home the same day as the surgery. However, patient status may necessitate hospital admission for observation and additional management. Since removal of the thyroid gland usually results in lower than normal thyroxine (T4) and triiodothyronine (T3), patients are often prescribed an oral synthetic thyroid hormone to address the deficiency, usually in the form of levothyroxine (Synthroid). Patients are also generally discharged with oral calcium supplementation to prevent hypocalcemia, which may present as paresthesias, tetany, hyperreflexia, and ECG changes. If these symptoms arise, additional oral calcium and calcitriol (Vitamin D) supplementation will usually resolve them, but more severe cases may require intravenous calcium and prolonged hospital admission. If thyroidectomy was indicated for thyroid cancer, patients may undergo post-operative radioactive iodine therapy to destroy tissue left behind during the operation.

== Complications and risks ==
As with any surgery, there is risk of post-operative pain, anesthetic complications, infection, and bleeding. Complications more specific to thyroidectomy include:

- Transient hypoparathyroidism in up to one third of patients, while 1-2% suffer from permanent hypoparathyroidism
- Injury to the recurrent laryngeal nerve in up to 11% of patients, manifesting as hoarseness, aspiration, and/or impaired cough reflex
- Damage to superior laryngeal nerve may result in subtle changes in voice pitch in up to 58% of patients
- Life-threatening airway compression due to hemorrhage/hematoma in up to 1% of cases or laryngeal obstruction due to bilateral recurrent laryngeal nerve injury in 0.1% of cases
- Esophageal or tracheal injury
- Chyle leak
- Horner's syndrome, rarely seen as a triad of ptosis, miosis, and anhidrosis
- Dysphagia

Note: Hypothyroidism is an expected outcome of total thyroidectomy but may present following partial thyroidectomy as well.

== Types of thyroidectomy ==
A lobectomy of the thyroid gland

A total thyroidect

- Hemithyroidectomy — Entire isthmus is removed along with the diseased lobe; utilized in benign diseases of only one lobe
- Subtotal thyroidectomy — Involves the removal of the majority of both lobes leaving behind 4-5 grams (equivalent to the size of a normal thyroid gland) of thyroid tissue on one or both sides; previously the most common operation for multinodular goiter (MNG), involving
- Partial thyroidectomy —Removal of the glandular portion in front of trachea after mobilization; performed for nontoxic MNG, but its role is controversial
- Near total thyroidectomy — Both lobes are removed except for a small amount of thyroid tissue (on one or both sides) in the vicinity of the recurrent laryngeal nerve entry point and the superior parathyroid gland
- Total thyroidectomy — Entire gland is removed; performed in cases of papillary, follicular, or medullary carcinoma of thyroid; now the most common operation for MNG
- Hartley Dunhill operation — Removal of one entire lateral lobe with isthmus and partial/subtotal removal of opposite lateral lobe; performed for nontoxic MNG, but rarely performed in the United States

Note: A thyroidectomy should not be confused with a thyroidotomy (thyrotomy), which is a cutting into (‑otomy) the thyroid, not a removal (‑ectomy, literally “out-cutting”) of it. A thyroidotomy can be performed to get access for a median laryngotomy, or to perform a biopsy. Although technically a biopsy involves removing some tissue, it is more frequently categorized as an ‑otomy than an ‑ectomy because the volume of tissue removed is minuscule.

== History ==
In 952 AD, the earliest confirmed thyroidectomy was recorded by Arab physician, surgeon, and chemist, Al-Zahrawi or Albucasis, sometimes referred to as the "father of surgery," who described the resection of a large goiter utilizing simple ligatures and cautery irons. In 1170 AD, a Salernitan surgeon by the name of Roger Frugardii performed the second reported thyroidectomy utilizing hot irons and setons to bring the goiter to the skin's surface before excising it, followed by the use of caustic powder to "purify" the remaining tissue. Due to surgical restrictions from the church, it wasn't until the Renaissance period that advancements in thyroid surgery were seen with the first partial thyroidectomy performed by Pierre-Joseph Desault in 1791 and the first thyroid isthmus separation accomplished by Victor von Bruns between 1851 and 1876.

== See also ==
- List of surgeries by type
- Thyroidotomy
