= Thyrotomy =

Surgical incision of the larynx through the thyroid cartilage

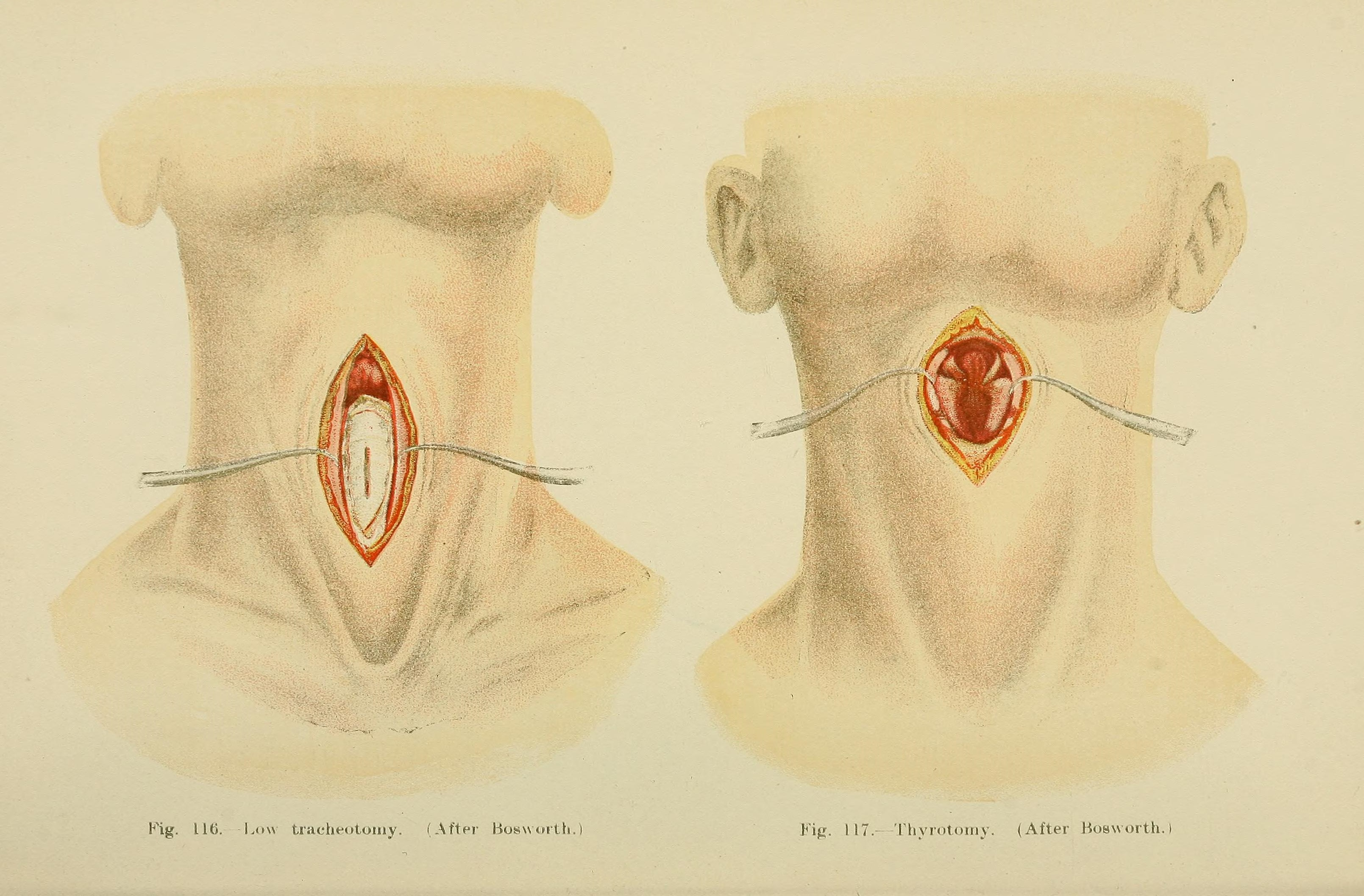

Thyrotomy may also refer to the cutting or biopsy the thyroid gland.

Thyrotomy (also called thyroidotomy, median laryngotomy, laryngofissure or thyrofissure) is an incision of the larynx through the thyroid cartilage.

== See also ==
- Laryngotomy
- Cricothyrotomy
- Tracheotomy
- List of surgeries by type
