= Cricothyroid joint =

Joint connecting the cricoid cartilage and the thyroid cartilage in the throat

- The cartilages of the larynx

Details

Identifiers
- Latin: articulatio cricothyreoidea
- TA98: A06.2.03.006
- TA2: 1665
- FMA: 55101

The cricothyroid joint (or articulation) is a joint connecting the cricoid cartilage and the thyroid cartilage. It plays a key role in adjusting human voice pitch by changing the tension of the vocal cords. This tension is controlled mostly by the endolaryngeal vocalis and the extralaryngeal cricothyroid muscles which change vocal fold tension by narrowing the cricothyroid space created by rotation and gliding movements in horizontal and vertical direction allowed for by the cricothyroid articulation.

== Types ==
Three types A, B, and C have been identified.

Type A is found in 56% of females and 66% of males. There is a well-defined "facet". It has a tight capsule and ligaments with either a concavity or a small groin directed from posterior superior to anterior inferior. Horizontal translational movement is about 3.0 mm, vertical gliding about 2.5 mm with greater movement horizontally than vertically. The gliding movements are smaller in males than in females.

Type B is in 24% of females and 20% of males. In contrary to type A it lacks a definite "facet" and the two cartilaginous parts of the articulation are joined only by soft connective tissue. Horizontal movement is 5.0 mm and vertical, 5.1 mm with no differences between them.

Type C concerns all others and has a flat surface with or without a tiny protuberance. Horizontal movement is about 5.1 mm, and vertical 3.8 mm.

Type A is less mobile than the other two.
