= Lateral thyrohyoid ligament =

Ligament of the larynx

- The ligaments of the larynx. Antero-lateral view.

Details

Identifiers
- Latin: ligamentum thyreohyoideum laterale, ligamentum hyothyreoideum laterale
- TA98: A06.2.02.017
- TA2: 1653
- FMA: 55139

The lateral thyrohyoid ligament (lateral hyothyroid ligament) is a round elastic cord, which forms the posterior border of the thyrohyoid membrane and passes between the tip of the superior cornu of the thyroid cartilage and the extremity of the greater cornu of the hyoid bone. The internal branch of the superior laryngeal nerve typical lies lateral to this ligament.

== Triticeal cartilage ==
A small cartilaginous nodule (cartilago triticea), sometimes bony, is frequently found in the lateral thyrohyoid ligament.
