= Superior laryngeal =

Superior laryngeal may refer to:

- Superior laryngeal artery
- Superior laryngeal nerve
