= Cricothyroid muscle =

Muscle of the larynx

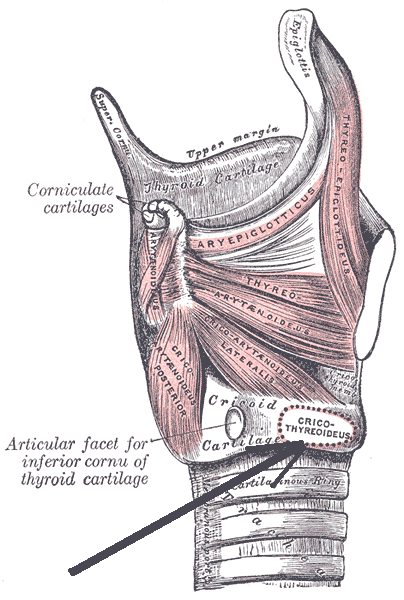
- Muscles of larynx. Side view. Right lamina of thyroid cartilage removed.

- The ligaments of the larynx. Antero-lateral view.

Details
- Origin: Anterior and lateral cricoid cartilage
- Insertion: Inferior cornu and lamina of the thyroid cartilage
- Nerve: External branch of superior laryngeal nerve (branch of the vagus nerve)
- Actions: Tension and elongation of the vocal folds

Identifiers
- Latin: musculus cricothyroideus
- TA98: A06.2.08.001
- TA2: 2193
- FMA: 46417

The cricothyroid muscle is the only tensor muscle of the larynx aiding with phonation. It is innervated by the superior laryngeal nerve. Its action tilts the thyroid cartilage forward to help tense the vocal cords, thus increasing the pitch of the voice.

== Structure ==
The cricothyroid muscle is a fan-shaped muscle situated at the outer surface of the larynx.

=== Origin ===
The cricothyroid muscle originates from the anterolateral aspect of the cricoid cartilage.

=== Insertion ===
The cricothyroid muscle splits into two groups or parts. The oblique part travels posterolaterally and inserts onto the inferior cornu of the thyroid cartilage. The straight part travels posterosuperiorly and inserts onto the inferior margin of the lamina of the thyroid cartilage.

=== Innervation ===
The cricothyroid muscle is innervated by the external branch of the superior laryngeal nerve (a branch of the vagus nerve). It is the only muscle innervated by this nerve.

== Function ==
The cricothyroid muscle produces tension and elongation of the vocal cords. They draw up the arch of the cricoid cartilage and tilt back the upper border of the cricoid cartilage lamina. The distance between the vocal processes and the angle of the thyroid is increased, elongating and thus tensing the vocal folds, thereby resulting in higher pitch phonation. They work as antagonists to the posterior cricoarytenoid muscles.

== Clinical significance ==
The cricothyroid muscles may be injected with botulinum toxin whilst treating spasmodic dysphonia. This is usually performed under guidance from electromyography.

== Additional images ==
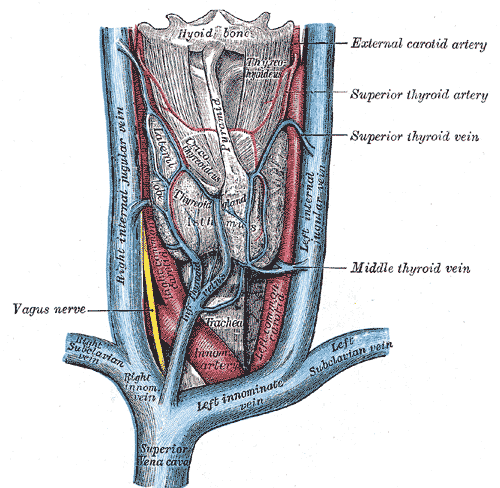
The veins of the thyroid gland.

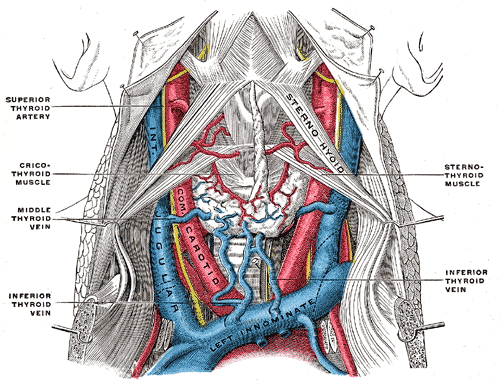
The fascia and middle thyroid veins.

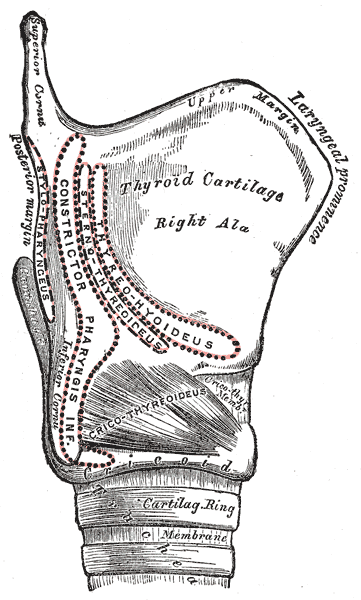
Side view of the larynx, showing muscular attachments.

== See also ==
- Cricothyroid ligament
- Larynx
- Vocal fold
- Thyroid cartilage
- Vocology - science and practice of voice habilitation
- Adam's apple
- Phonation
- National Center for Voice and Speech
- Cricothyroid approximation
