= Percutaneous transtracheal ventilation =

- Specialty: Pulmonology

Percutaneous transtracheal ventilation is a form of conventional ventilation by which oxygen is delivered to the lungs using a high pressure gas source through an over-the-needle catheter inserted through the skin into the trachea.

Percutaneous transtracheal ventilation may be mistaken for transtracheal jet ventilation, which is not considered conventional ventilation and refers to high-frequency ventilation; a low tidal volume ventilation and needs specialized ventilators only available in critical care units.
