= Median thyrohyoid ligament =

Ligament of the larynx

- The human larynx

Details

Identifiers
- Latin: ligamentum thyreohyoideum medianum
- TA98: A06.2.02.014
- TA2: 1652
- FMA: 55138

The median thyrohyoid ligament (also middle hyothyroid ligament or middle thyrohyoid ligament) is the thicker, middle part of the thyrohyoid membrane. Its lateral thinner portions are pierced by the superior laryngeal vessels and the internal branch of the superior laryngeal nerve. Its anterior surface is in relation with the thyrohyoideus, sternohyoideus, and omohyoideus muscles, and with the body of the hyoid bone.
