= Prelaryngeal lymph nodes =

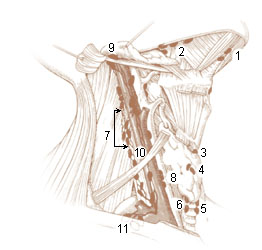
- 3. Prelaryngeal

Details
- System: Lymphatic system

Identifiers
- Latin: nodi lymphoidei praelaryngei

Prelaryngeal lymph nodes are lymph nodes located anterior to the larynx.

One such node is the Delphian node situated above the isthmus of the thyroid gland, which may be removed at the time of a thyroidectomy as a sentinel lymph node in order to identify risks of cancer spread.
