= Cricothyrotomy =

Incision in the neck to make an airway

- In cricothyrotomy, the incision or puncture is made through the cricothyroid membrane in between the thyroid cartilage and the cricoid cartilage.
- Other names: Cric
- ICD-9-CM: 31.1
- MeSH: D014140
- MedlinePlus: 003017

A cricothyrotomy (also called cricothyroidotomy or laryngotomy) is a medical procedure where an opening is created through the cricothyroid membrane to establish a patent airway during emergency airway management. Cricothyrotomy is primarily performed as the last step in airway management algorithms in cases where an airway cannot be established by other means of nasal or oral tracheal intubation. These situations, often referred to as "cannot intubate, cannot ventilate" (CICV) or "cannot intubate, cannot oxygenate" (CICO), are commonly seen as a result of airway obstruction, angioedema, trauma, burns, or abnormal anatomy.

Multiple types of cricothyrotomy may be considered for emergency surgical airway management, including surgical cricothyrotomy and needle cricothyrotomy. Surgical cricothyrotomy is performed by inserting a large-bore tube through an opening in the cricothyroid membrane created via incision or using the Seldinger technique. Needle cricothyrotomy is performed by inserting a catheter through the cricothyroid membrane and connecting it to a ventilation bag or a high-pressure oxygen source in a process called transtracheal jet ventilation. Various cricothyrotomy techniques have been portrayed in popular media but should only be performed by trained medical professionals.

Although alternative surgical techniques for securing an emergency airway exist, including tracheotomy, current guidelines recommend the use of surgical cricothyrotomy as the preferred method. Due to the importance of establishing an airway, there are few contraindications to performing the procedure. Although complications from cricothyrotomy are possible, including failure to secure the patient's airway and bleeding, studies suggest that the rate of complications is lower than tracheostomy when performed in airway emergencies.

While cricothyrotomy may be life-saving in extreme circumstances, this technique is only intended to be used temporarily until an alternative method can be used for long-term ventilatory support.

== Indications ==
Cricothyrotomy is one option for obtaining an invasive/surgical airway, which is used as the last resort in emergency airway algorithms for both pediatric and adult patients. When surgical airway management is required, surgical cricothyrotomy is recommended as the first-line method for obtaining an emergency airway in adult patients. Due to anatomic differences in neonates and young children, needle cricothyrotomy is recommended for these patients.

Use of cricothyrotomy is indicated in any "cannot intubate, cannot ventilate" (CICV) or "cannot intubate, cannot oxygenate" (CICO) situation, typically after other techniques of tracheal intubation have been attempted through oropharyngeal or nasopharyngeal routes. Once a CICV or CICO situation is identified, a surgical airway is indicated and should be performed as quickly as possible by a trained clinician.

Some common causes of CICV and CICO scenarios include:

- Airway obstruction (e.g., by foreign body or tumor)
- Trauma to the face or neck
- Angioedema
- Burns to the face or neck
- Abnormal anatomy
- Failure to establish an airway through the nose or mouth

== Contraindications ==
In the event of a "cannot intubate, cannot ventilate" (CICV) or "cannot intubate, cannot oxygenate" (CICO), establishing an airway is essential. Therefore, there are few contraindications to performing an emergency cricothyrotomy.

=== Absolute contraindications ===
Due to the importance of establishing a definitive airway in emergencies, some sources state that there are no absolute contraindications. However, other sources list some absolute contraindications to the procedure, including:

- Ability to establish an airway using less invasive techniques (e.g., tracheal intubation)
- Complete airway obstruction

=== Relative contraindications ===
Relative contraindications to performing cricothyrotomy include, but are not limited to, the following:

- Inability to identify anatomic landmarks
- Abnormalities of the trachea (e.g., prior surgery, fracture, transection)
- Abnormalities of the larynx (e.g., fracture, acute disease)
- Infection of the neck
- Coagulopathy
- Needle cricothyrotomy only: Infants and small children (age limits differ between sources)

== Procedure ==
=== Surgical (Open) ===
A surgical cricothyrotomy is generally performed by making a vertical incision on the skin of the throat just below the laryngeal prominence (Adam's apple in males) followed by a horizontal incision through the cricothyroid membrane. A tracheostomy tube or endotracheal tube is then inserted through the incisions, the cuff is inflated, and the tube is secured.

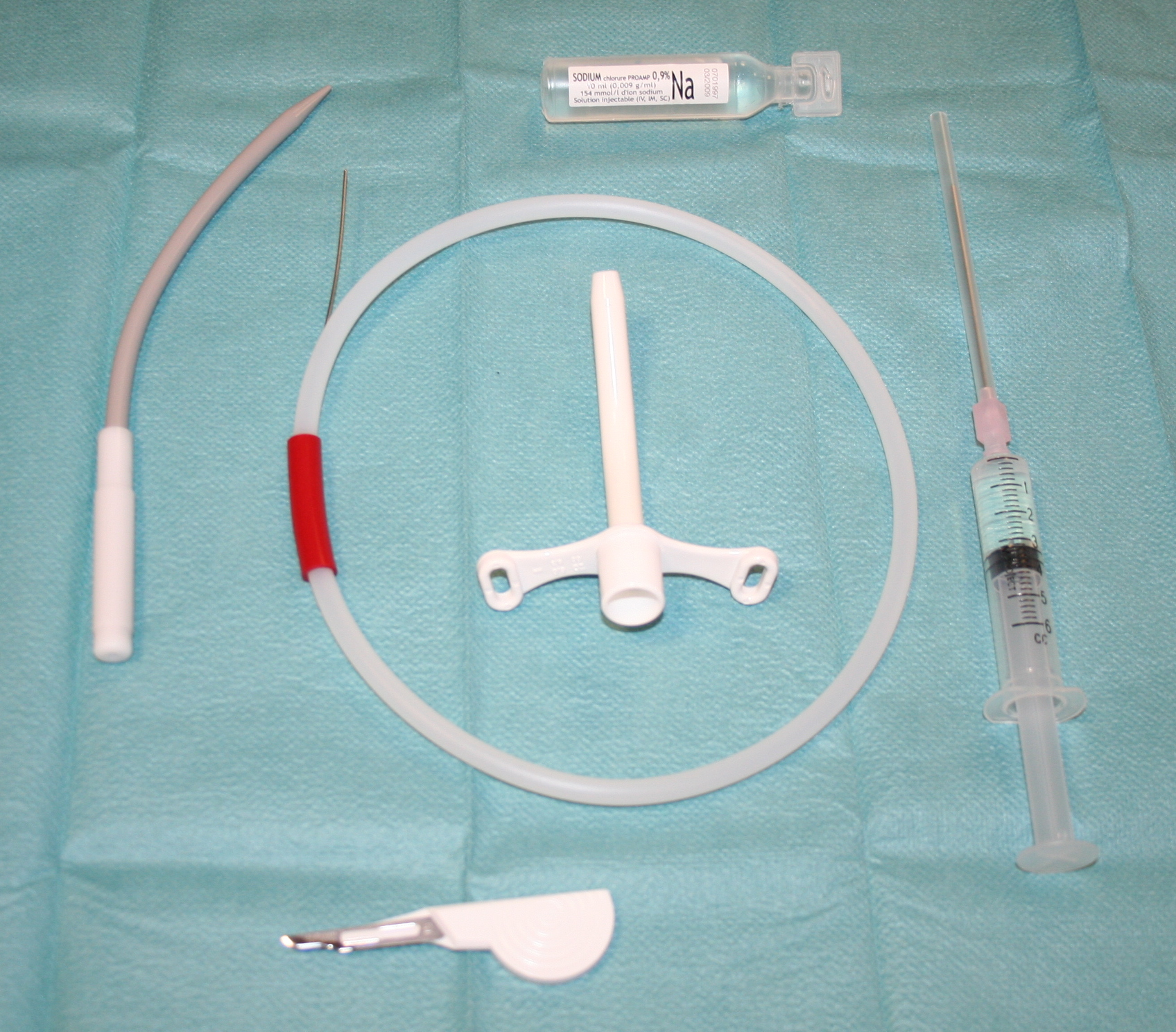
Cricothyrotomy kit

The tube is connected to a bag valve mask (BVM) or ventilator followed by confirmation of correct placement with end-tidal capnography. Point-of-care ultrasound (POCUS) can also be a helpful tool used to guide the procedure and/or confirm the placement of the tracheal tube.

Alternatively, multiple cricothyrotomy kits are commercially available for use in the procedure, including kits that are designed for use with the Seldinger technique and kits that are non-Seldinger based.

=== Needle (Percutaneous) ===
A needle cricothyrotomy is generally performed by inserting a large over-the-needle catheter (12- to 14-gauge) through the cricothyroid membrane and into the trachea. The provider performing the procedure will continually apply negative pressure on the attached syringe while the needle is advanced caudally at a 30-45 degree angle until air is aspirated into the syringe.

Once needle placement is confirmed by aspiration of air bubbles into the syringe, the catheter is advanced, and the needle is removed. Finally, the catheter is attached to an oxygen source. There are multiple options for oxygen sources, including a ventilation bag or a high-pressure oxygen source. The delivery of oxygen using a high-pressure gas source is considered a form of conventional ventilation called percutaneous transtracheal ventilation (PTV).

Although some texts discourage the use of needle cricothyrotomy in adult patients, others state that it may be preferred over surgical cricothyrotomy when the provider performing the procedure has greater experience with this technique.

== Complications ==
Cricothyrotomy is a potentially life-saving procedure that should be used only as a last resort to establish an emergency airway. However, there are risks of complications that may result from performing the procedure, with reported complication rates varying from 0% to 54% in the literature.

Potential complications can be categorized as early or late based on the timing of their occurrence.

=== Early complications ===
Potential early complications of cricothyrotomy include, but are not limited to, the following:

- Failure to establish an airway
- Bleeding
- Injury to the thyroid, cricoid, or tracheal cartilages
- Damage to the larynx or trachea
- Incorrect placement of the tube
- Pneumothorax
- Tube obstruction

=== Late complications ===
Potential late complications of cricothyrotomy include, but are not limited to, the following:

- Airway stenosis
- Difficulty swallowing (also known as dysphagia)
- Voice changes (also known as dysphonia)
- Infection
- Persistent stoma

== Training ==
Given advancements in airway techniques and adjuncts, cricothyrotomy is an important but rarely performed procedure. There are multiple methods used to train clinicians to perform cricothyrotomies, including simulation-based training, cadavers, animal models, and others. The ACGME currently requires three cricothyrotomy attempts during emergency medicine residency training, but data suggests that further attempts may improve provider skill and confidence.

== History ==
The history of tracheal intubation and the use of surgical airways can be traced back to Ancient Egypt. However, it was not until 1909 that Dr. Chevalier Jackson became the first person to present a formal approach for cricothyrotomy, which he called a "high tracheostomy" at the time.

== In popular media ==
On the TV show M*A*S*H, Father Mulcahy performs an emergency cricothyrotomy on a patient. With the direction of Dr. Pierce via radio, he uses a pen, knife and an eyedropper to perform the operation.

In the 1980 Nicolas Roeg film Bad Timing, Theresa Russell's character Milena Flaherty has an emergency cricothyrotomy performed following an intentional overdose.

In Grey's Anatomy, emergency cricothyrotomy is mentioned in at least three episodes:

- In "Owner of a Lonely Heart," Cristina almost performs an emergency cricothyrotomy on a patient who swallowed a light bulb. Before she is able to do so, however, Dr. Burke shows up and takes the patient to an operating room where he proceeds to perform an emergency thoracotomy.
- In "The Heart of the Matter," Izzie performs her first emergency crike on Camille, a niece of Chief of Surgery Dr. Richard Webber.
- In "I Saw What I Saw" Alex performs a crike on the patient who later dies.

In the ER episode "Reason to Believe" Dr. Kerry Weaver performs an emergency cricothyrotomy on a student. She is shooting a news segment on childhood obesity in an elementary school cafeteria when one of the students begins to choke; after the heimlich maneuver fails, she performs a cricothyrotomy with a kitchen knife and a drinking straw. It is also used many other times, especially in the trauma room, when an airway cannot be established.

In the film Playing God (1997), David Duchovny plays a famed LA surgeon, stripped of his license due to drug abuse, who finds himself witnessing a gunfight at a bar. He saves a mafia crime figure by performing an emergency cricothyrotomy. This endears him with the mafia family and drives the plot forward.

In the BBC3 medical drama Bodies, the main protagonist Rob Lake, a newly appointed obstetrics and gynaecology registrar (played by Max Beesley), is called to a patient who is having difficulty breathing due to epiglottitis. Lake calls for emergency assistance but help is slow coming, so fearing for the patient's life decides to undertake a cricothyrotomy himself - a procedure he has not been trained in. The procedure is unsuccessful and the patient dies before help arrives. The guilt surrounding the event combined with the covering up by his consultant provides an important backdrop to the further development of the character and his relationship with his consultant.

In Dr. Quinn, Medicine Woman, Sully, the white man raised by Native Americans who is her lover and companion, performs the procedure on one of Dr. Quinn's boys using a bird's feather (the base where it is hollow).

During an episode of the National Geographic Channel documentary "Inside Combat Rescue", a US Air Force Pararescueman in Afghanistan performs an actual cricothyrotomy on a wounded civilian, in a helicopter maneuvering under combat conditions. The procedure is successful and the patient is delivered to Kandahar Regional Medical Hospital.

On the New Zealand soap opera Shortland Street, Series 21, Episode 5104/5105, student doctor Paige Munroe performs a cricothyrotomy with a pocket knife and pen and saves a woman's life, even though she was not qualified (and nervous).

In the novel Night Train to Lisbon by Swiss author Pascal Mercier, one of the protagonists saves the life of his asphyxiating sister by performing a provisional cricothyrotomy with a ballpoint pen.

In the 1997 film Anaconda, when the character Dr. Steven Cale (Eric Stoltz) is stung in the mouth by a venomous wasp found in his scuba equipment, Paul Serone (Jon Voight) performs the procedure using a pocket knife and rigid plastic tube.

In the manga Golden Wind, the fifth story arc of JoJo's Bizarre Adventure, the character Narancia Ghirga has his tongue cut off, requiring the use of only a pen in an emergency cricothyrotomy.

In the 2021 film Nobody, the character Hutch performs a crude cricothyroidotomy with a straw on Teddy after a fight in which he breaks his windpipe.

== See also ==
- Surgical airway management
- Tracheotomy
- History of tracheal intubation
- List of surgeries by type
