= Complications of anesthetic gases =

Nitrous oxide, desflurane, sevoflurane and isoflurane are the most commonly used anesthetic gases, and their incorrect usage may cause systemic complications, including acute, subacute and chronic symptoms, and present multiple hazards, including biological and chemical toxicity, among other hemodynamic and organ-specific effects. In general, anesthetic gases have been used for decades in anesthesia delivery, and safe usage of these gases lead to benefits that ultimately outweigh the complications of misuse. When complications do occur, these have been shown to be directly correlated to chronic, excess exposure above occupational standards, most commonly due to leakage, storage failure and misuse. Multiple methods of prevention have been recommended, including the implementation of effective scavenging systems, frequent anesthetic circuit leakage checks, as well as the switch to low-flow anesthesia techniques and the use of total intravenous anaesthesia (TIVA) as alternatives.

== Symptoms of anesthetic gas exposure ==
=== Acute symptoms ===
Reported symptoms related to acute exposure of anesthetic waste gases are nonspecific, with headache, fatigue, lethargy, nausea and vomiting as well as mucosal irritation being the most common symptoms as self-reported by anesthesia providers. Based on provider surveys, these symptoms seem to be directly related to how often said providers were exposed to smelling these waste gases in the operating room. Nitrous oxide (medication) in particular, when inhaled at high concentrations, may lead to acute neurological symptoms including seizures, coma and in severe cases even death. Furthermore, when nitrous oxide is used recreationally and inhaled directly from a charger, such as a Whipped-cream charger, it can lead to severe frostbite of the lips, mouth and throat, as well as the lungs. The latter is particularly worrisome, as this process can result in Pneumothorax, or build up of air between the chest wall and lungs, a potentially life-threatening condition if not addressed with prompt medical treatment.

=== Subacute symptoms ===
While conclusions regarding subacute symptoms for volatile anesthetics including Isoflurane, Sevoflurane and Desflurane remain unclear, extensive research has been conducted regarding subacute neurological symptoms cause by Nitrous oxide (medication). Nitrous oxide exposure is believed to cause irreversible inactivation of Vitamin B12, which is essential in the production of the myelin sheath around nerves that helps transmit action potentials. This Vitamin B12 deficiency can ultimately lead to subacute combined degeneration of the spinal cord with associated symptoms including paresthesias (numbness/tingling), unsteady gait, motor weakness/paralysis and loss of sensation. Through this process, severe forms of B12 deficiency that results from excess nitrous oxide gas can also cause psychiatric problems including symptoms such as confusion, hallucinations and even memory loss.

=== Chronic symptoms / immune system regulation ===
Chronic exposure to certain anesthetic gases can lead to a variety of issues, in particular the alteration of the immune system and increased levels of Pro-inflammatory cytokines. Based on a systematic review by the American Society of Anesthesiologists, volatile anesthetics have been shown to both affect the innate immune system as well as the adaptive immune system. Isoflurane and Sevoflurane have been shown to suppress the immune system, particularly by decreasing the function of neutrophils and macrophages. Sevoflurane exposure in particular was found to cause an increase in pro-inflammatory cytokines such as TNF-a, Interleukin 6 and Interleukin 1 beta. Halothane and Desflurane were proposed to have similar effects on the immune system as Isoflurane and Sevoflurane, with an emphasis on decreasing neutrophil/macrophage function and white blood cell production. A narrative review described this disruption in immune system function as a problem that can ultimately lead to increased risk of opportunistic infections, especially in individuals who are already immunocompromised. Furthermore, while rare, there have been case reports linking chronic exposure to Sevoflurane with allergic dermatitis.

== Types of hazards ==
=== Biological toxicity ===
The effects of biological toxicity include gene mutations, reproductive system abnormalities as well as immune system dysfunction.

- Gene toxicity: Results from a systematic review showed that exposure to anesthetic gases caused a statistically significant increase in a variety of gene-specific parameters, including increasing frequency of chromosome abnormalities, DNA strand breaks and increased exchange of sister chromatids during mitosis. Collectively these changes were most prevalent in members of the operating room team, and have been proposed to be due to anesthetic gas exposure. Another meta-analysis conducted in 2025 utilizing a comet assay showed that occupational exposure to these gases specifically leads to DNA strand breaks in human white blood cells, which can potentially lead to further immune system abnormalities as well.
- Reproductive toxicity: A recent systematic review demonstrated that OR nurses displayed a higher risk of spontaneous abortion (miscarriage), along with a decrease in overall fertility and an increase in the risk of congenital abnormalities for those that do end up becoming pregnant. These findings were proposed to be due to repetitive exposure to anesthetic gases on a daily basis.
- Developmental neurotoxicity: Studies in the past have also suggested that early exposure to anesthetic gases, in particular sevoflurane, may increase the risk of neurodegenerative diseases, apoptosis of neurons, and accumulation of amyloid beta which is a proposed mechanism of Alzheimer's disease development. These findings appear to be especially important in both elderly and pediatric populations, due to their susceptibility to nervous system changes.

=== Chemical toxicity ===
The effects of chemical toxicity include metabolic changes to multiple organs and systems, including the liver, kidneys and blood cells.

- Hepatotoxicity: Hepatic (liver) enzymes, particularly cytochrome P450, work to break down anesthetic gases into metabolites that become active and damage liver cells, primarily through direct toxicity to cell contact as well as activation of inflammatory immune responses. This damaging process can ultimately lead to death of liver cells, referred to as hepatic necrosis. The anesthetic gas that has been shown to be most responsible for this process is halothane, which causes hepatic injury via the same mechanisms previously described, in particular via release of haptens during oxidative metabolism, which ultimately triggers a profound inflammatory response within liver cells.
- Nephrotoxicity: Nephrotoxicity, also known as kidney toxicity has been demonstrated in rat models with the use of sevoflurane. It has been shown that sevoflurane interacts with CO2 absorbent soda lime to produce an especially toxic compound known as compound A which leads to direct kidney damage in rats. The effects of compound A are still being studied in human models, however.
- Hematological toxicity: The most studied hematological effects have been conducted on nitrous oxide, as prolonged exposure to the gas itself leads to inactivation of vitamin B12 and consequent bone marrow disruption. This can lead to irreversible depression of bone marrow and production of blood cells, leading to a variety of downstream hematological complications.

=== Other systemic effects ===
- Cardiopulmonary effects: While anesthetic gases are not directly toxic to the cardiovascular system, inhaled anesthetics do cause profound cardiovascular effects, including decreases in myocardial contractility, or the heart's ability to contract, as well as afterload, or the pressure in which the ventricles of the heart need to overcome in order to eject blood into the arterial system of the body. In addition, these inhaled gases also cause a blunting effect on the sympathetic nervous system, leading to systemic vasodilation. Together, these effects all lead to increased systemic hypotension, which must be controlled intra-operatively to ensure the patient remains stable. In terms of the effects of specific gases, halothane was found to significantly reduce mean arterial pressure as well as cardiac output, leading to profound fluctuations in hemodynamic stability, making its use less suitable for unstable patients. Conversely, gases such as isoflurane and sevoflurane have been shown to be more hemodynamically stable, causing less fluctuations in the heart's ability to pump blood and oxygenate tissue effectively. In terms of effects on the pulmonary (lung) system, it was found in a Cochrane review that nitrous oxide increases the risk of pulmonary atelectasis, while another study found that it simultaneously increases the risk of myocardial infarction.

== Causes ==
There are a multitude of causes that contribute to the exposure of excess anesthetic gases in the hospital setting which can ultimately cause the aforementioned complications. Among these causes include gas escape upon refilling gas vaporizers, particularly when inadvertently overfilling said vaporizers. Leaks in high pressure systems involved with delivery of anesthetic gases in the operating room have been documented as early as 1977 as a substantial cause of excess anesthetic gas pollution, with leaks occurring in both high and low-pressure systems within the circuitry of anesthesia machines, which has been improved over the years via scavenging systems. Another major contributor to anesthetic gas leak is mask ventilation which was shown in one study to account for roughly 40% of cases in which excess levels of nitrous oxide were detected in the operating room setting. Furthermore, an additional cause of anesthetic gas leakage includes escape of gas from around the patient's endotracheal tube, particularly in pediatric patients in which uncuffed endotracheal tubes are being used. The same study that discussed leaks in mask ventilation showed that these uncuffed tubes accounted for roughly 12% of detected cases in which there were excess nitrous oxide levels.

== Exposure standards and prevention ==
The current guidelines for anesthetic gas exposure, as designated by the National Institute for Occupational Safety and Health (NIOSH), are to maintain levels of nitrous oxide exposure below 25 ppm as an average over time, while keeping the exposure to halogenated agents to below a maximum of 2 ppm when considering volatile anesthetics. Exceeding these levels increases the risk of developing the wide array of complications listed previously. Important to note, however, is that these standards were determined in 1977, and the only volatile agent tested at the time was halothane. Research is still ongoing regarding exposure limits to other volatile anesthetics more commonly used today, and a new report regarding these agents has not yet been published.

Regarding prevention, there are multiple ways that exposure to excess anesthetic gases can be mitigated, including the following:

1. Implementation of efficient scavenging systems within the operative and perioperative settings. The use of exhaust fans, pressure systems and/or laminar flow air conditioning, when coupled to efficient scavenging systems has consistently been shown to keep atmospheric levels of nitrous oxide below the NIOSH guidelines. As of 2016, a national survey of anesthesia providers showed that scavenging systems have been systematically implemented, with roughly 97% of providers stating that their workplace used such systems.
2. Routine leak checks of anesthetic equipment. The practice of frequently checking for anesthetic gas leakage within the anesthesia machine circuit is an essential practice to ensure that the gases remain in a closed system and do not leak into the atmosphere. A national survey conducted in 2016 showed that up to 5% of anesthesia providers do not regularly check for leaks within their anesthetic systems, which poses a major problem as not all providers are following national recommendations, contributing to unnecessary instances of excess gas exposure.
3. Use of low-flow anesthesia techniques is another method of preventing excess exposure in the perioperative setting, and can help mitigate environmental exposure as well. Minimizing fresh gas flow rates to below 1.5 L/min, when coupled with efficient scavenging systems, has been shown to significantly decrease the atmospheric concentrations of both isoflurane and nitrous oxide. This is important on both an environmental level to help decrease greenhouse gas exposure as well as occupational exposure.
4. Considering total intravenous anaesthesia (TIVA) as an alternative approach to use of anesthetic gases. TIVA has been found to be a safe alternative to the use of anesthetic gases to accomplish general anesthesia, as indicated by a meta-analysis conducted in 2024, and its use naturally decreases the risk of exposure to the aforementioned gases.

== See also ==
- A.C.E. mixture - a mixture of ethanol, chloroform and diethyl ether
- Anaesthetic
- Concentration effect
