= Cricothyroid ligament =

Ligament of the larynx

- The ligaments of the larynx. Antero-lateral view.

Details

Identifiers
- Latin: ligamentum cricothyroideum
- FMA: 55233

The cricothyroid ligament (also known as the cricothyroid membrane or cricovocal membrane) is a ligament in the larynx. It connects the cricoid cartilage to the thyroid cartilage. It prevents these cartilages from moving too far apart. It is cut during an emergency cricothyrotomy to treat upper airway obstruction.

== Structure ==
The cricothyroid ligament is composed of two parts:

- the median cricothyroid ligament along the midline (a thickening of the cricothyroid membrane). It is a flat band of white connective tissue that connects the front parts of the contiguous margins of the cricoid and thyroid cartilages. It is a thick and strong ligament, narrow above and broad below.
- the lateral cricothyroid ligaments on each side (also known as coni elastici "elastic cones"). Each is overlapped on either side by laryngeal muscles.

The conus elasticus (which means elastic cone in Latin) is the lateral portion of the cricothyroid ligament. The lateral portions are thinner and lie close under the mucous membrane of the larynx; they extend from the upper border of the cricoid cartilage to the lower margin of the vocal ligaments, with which they are continuous. The vocal ligaments may therefore be regarded as the free borders of each conus elasticus. They extend from the vocal processes of the arytenoid cartilages to the angle of the thyroid cartilage about midway between its upper and lower borders.

=== Relations ===
The prelaryngeal lymph node (also known as the Delphian lymph node) sits anterior to the median cricothyroid ligament.

== Function ==
The cricothyroid ligament prevents the cricoid cartilage and the thyroid cartilage from moving too far apart.

== Clinical significance ==
The cricothyroid ligament is cut during an emergency cricothyrotomy. This kind of surgical intervention is necessary during airway obstruction above the level of vocal folds.

== History ==
The cricothyroid ligament is named after the two structures it connects: the cricoid cartilage and the thyroid cartilage. It is also known as the cricothyroid membrane, and the cricovocal membrane. The various parts of the cricothyroid ligament have been named in many different ways, which can cause confusion.

== Other animals ==
The cricothyroid ligament can be found in many other animals, such as cats, dogs, and horses. The trachea can be accessed through the cricothyroid ligament, such as for aspiration. It can be an important landmark.

== Additional images ==
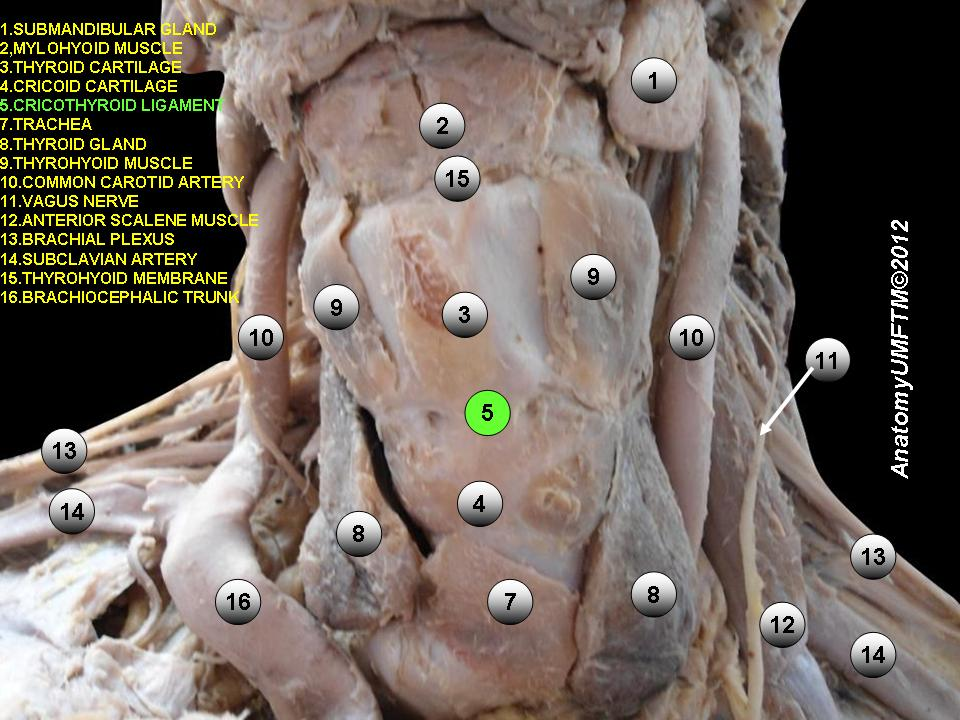
Cricothyroid ligament

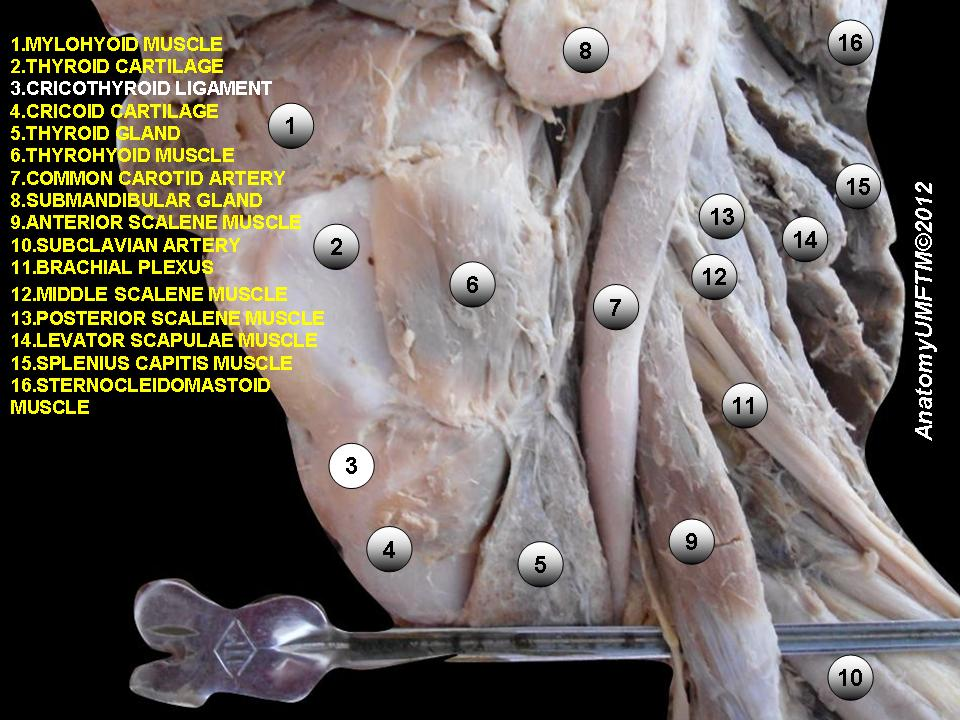
Cricothyroid ligament

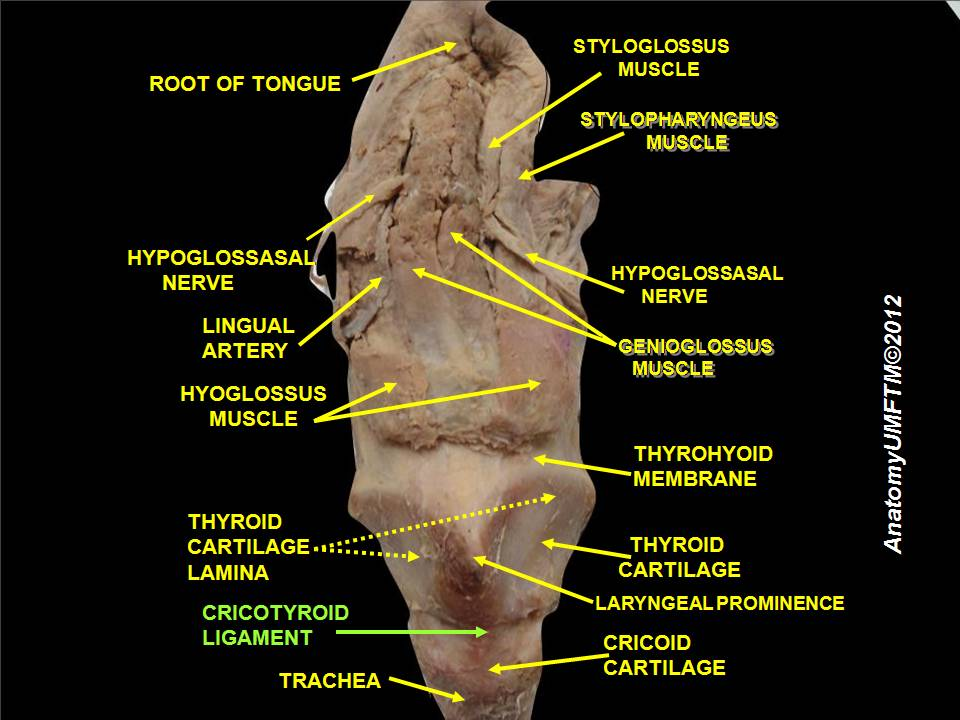
Cricothyroid ligament

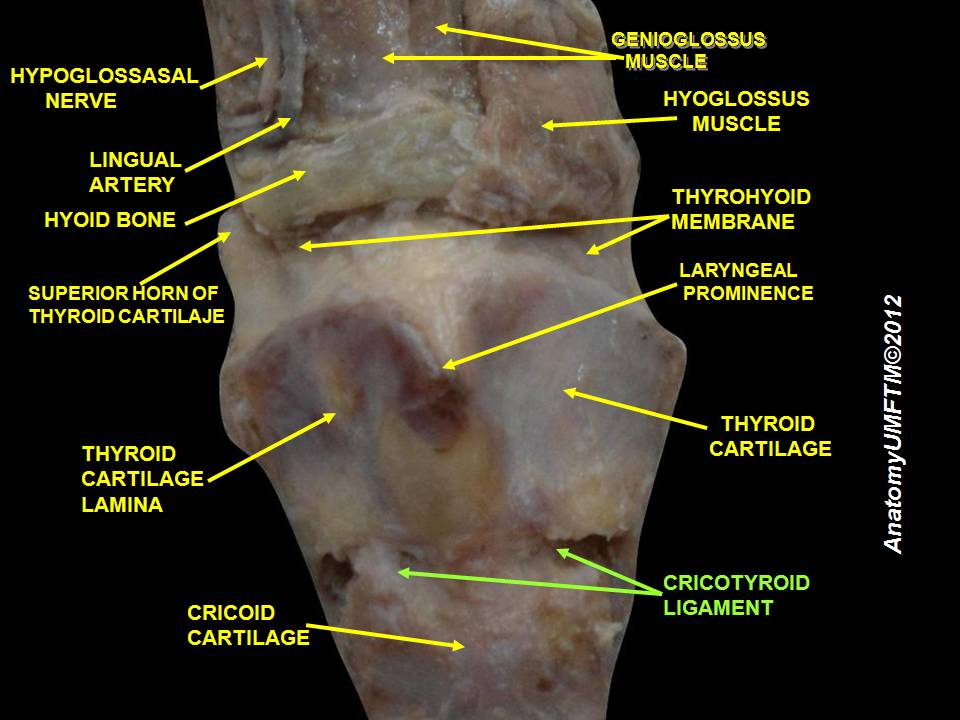
Cricothyroid ligament

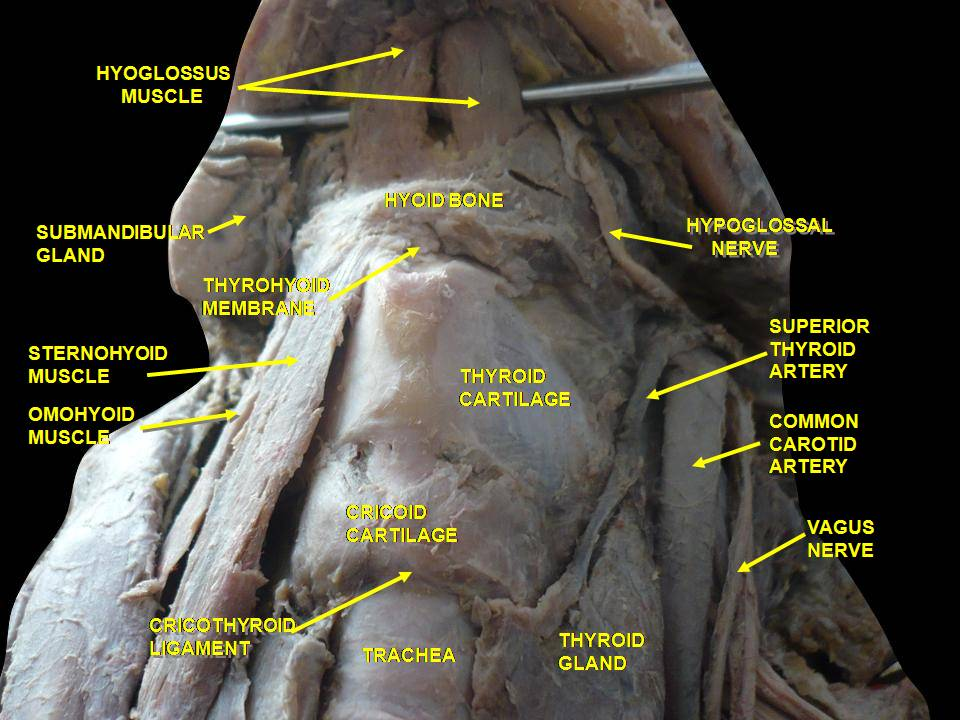
Muscles, nerves and arteries of neck. Deep dissection. Anterior view.

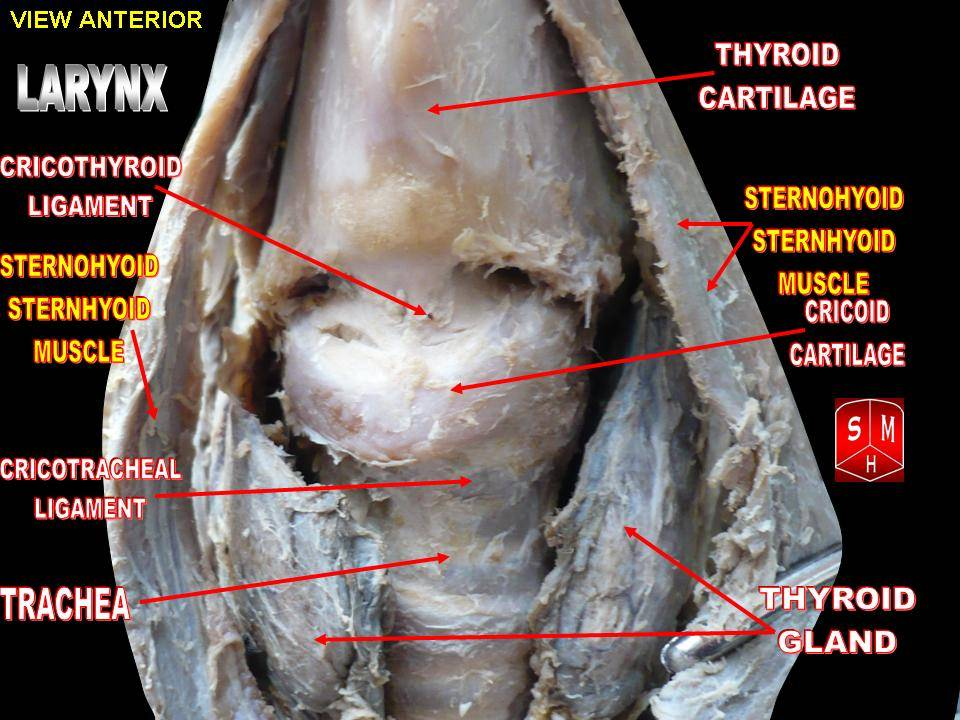
Cricothyroid ligament
