= Superior laryngeal nerve =

Branch of the vagus nerve

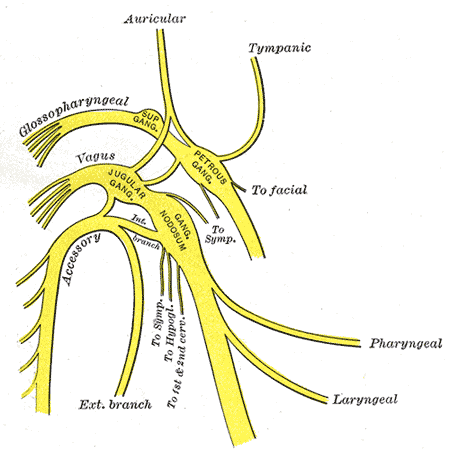
- Plan of upper portions of glossopharyngeal nerve, vagus nerve, and accessory nerve. ("Laryngeal" labeled at lower right.)

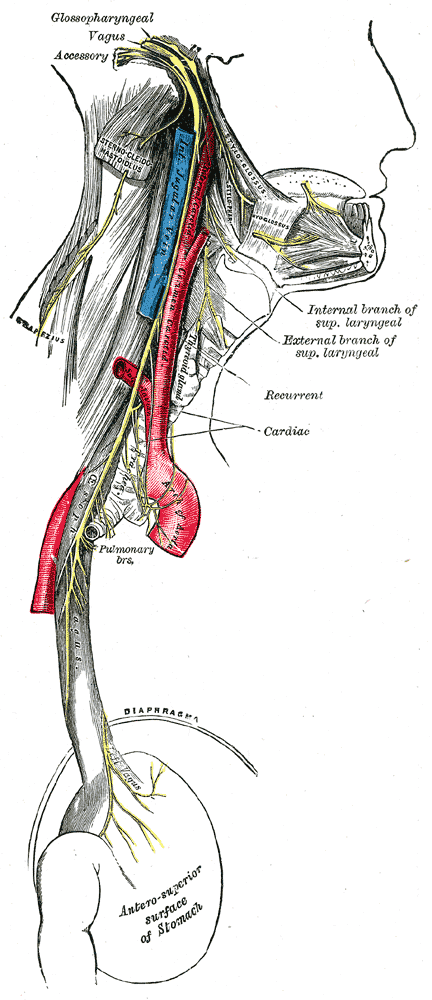
- Course and distribution of the glossopharyngeal, vagus, and accessory nerves. (Branches visible in upper right.)

Details
- From: Vagus nerve
- Innervates: Larynx

Identifiers
- Latin: nervus laryngeus superior
- TA98: A14.2.01.160
- TA2: 6339
- FMA: 6239

The superior laryngeal nerve is a branch of the vagus nerve. It arises from the middle of the inferior ganglion of the vagus nerve and additionally receives a sympathetic branch from the superior cervical ganglion.

The superior laryngeal nerve produces two branches: the internal laryngeal nerve (its sensory branch) which supplies sensory fibers to the laryngeal mucosa, and the external laryngeal nerve (its motor branch) which innervates the cricothyroid muscle.

== Structure ==
=== Origin ===
The superior laryngeal nerve arises from the middle of the inferior ganglion of vagus nerve.

=== Course ===
The superior laryngeal nerve descends by the side of the pharynx deep to the internal carotid artery before dividing into two branches —the external laryngeal nerve and the internal laryngeal nerve.

=== Branches ===
==== External laryngeal nerve ====
The external laryngeal nerve is the smaller, external branch. It descends on the larynx, beneath the sternothyroid muscle, to supply the cricothyroid muscle. The external branch functions to stretch the vocal cords by activating the cricothyroid muscle, increasing pitch. The external laryngeal nerve gives branches to pharyngeal plexus and the superior portion of the inferior pharyngeal constrictor, and communicates with the superior cardiac nerve behind the common carotid artery.

==== Internal laryngeal nerve ====
The internal laryngeal nerve is the internal branch. It descends to the thyrohyoid membrane, piercing it in company with the superior laryngeal artery, and is distributed to the mucous membrane of the larynx. Of these sensory branches, some are distributed to the epiglottis, the base of the tongue, and the epiglottic glands; others pass posteriorly, in the aryepiglottic fold, to supply the mucous membrane surrounding the entrance of the larynx, and the mucous lining of the larynx as far down as the vocal folds.

A filament descends beneath the mucous membrane on the inner surface of the thyroid cartilage and joins the recurrent laryngeal nerve. Above the vocal folds the sensory innervation of the larynx is via the internal laryngeal nerve. Below the vocal folds it is by way of branches of the recurrent laryngeal nerve. The vocal fold itself receives dual innervation from both nerves.

== Function ==
The superior laryngeal nerve innervates the cricothyroid muscle.

== Clinical significance ==
A superior laryngeal nerve palsy changes the pitch of the voice and causes an inability to make explosive sounds due to paralysis of the cricothyroid muscle. If no recovery is evident three months after the palsy initially presents, the damage is most likely to be permanent. A bilateral palsy presents as a tiring and hoarse voice. It can be injured in surgery involving the removal of the thyroid gland (thyroidectomy). Understanding the most common anatomic variations of the distal portion of the external laryngeal nerve and its relation to the inferior constrictor muscle is critical and allows identifying and preserving the integrity of this nerve in most cases. The external branch is susceptible to damage during thyroidectomy or cricothyrotomy, as it lies immediately deep to the superior thyroid artery. The ability to produce pitched sounds is then impaired along with easy voice fatigability.

Irritation of the internal laryngeal nerve results in uncontrolled coughing - usually as a result of food or water in the laryngopharynx. A lesion of this branch (for example, during surgery) is associated with a loss of the cough reflex and an elevated risk of aspiration pneumonia.

== See also ==
- Recurrent laryngeal nerve

== Additional images ==
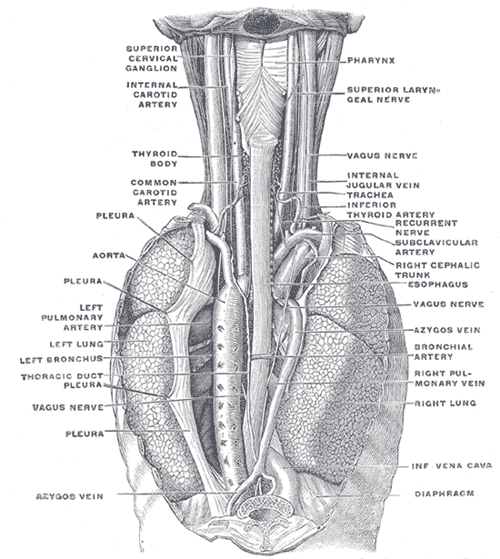
The position and relation of the esophagus in the cervical region and in the posterior mediastinum. Seen from behind.
