= Transtracheal jet ventilation =

Transtracheal jet ventilation refers to a type of high-frequency ventilation, low tidal volume ventilation provided via a laryngeal catheter by specialized ventilators that are usually only available in the operating room or intensive care unit. This procedure is occasionally employed in the operating room when a difficult airway is anticipated, such as Treacher Collins syndrome, Robin sequence, head and neck surgery with supraglottic or glottic obstruction. It is NOT recommended in emergencies if a person cannot be intubated or ventilated by other means.
