= Thyrohyoid membrane =

Elastic membrane in the larynx

- The ligaments of the larynx. Antero-lateral view.

Details
- System: skeletal

Identifiers
- Latin: membrana thyrohyoidea, membrana hyothyreoidea
- TA98: A06.2.02.013
- TA2: 1651
- FMA: 55132

The thyrohyoid membrane (or hyothyroid membrane) is a broad, fibro-elastic sheet of the larynx. It connects the upper border of the thyroid cartilage to the hyoid bone.

== Structure ==
The thyrohyoid membrane is attached below to the upper border of the thyroid cartilage and to the front of its superior cornu, and above to the upper margin of the posterior surface of the body and greater cornu of the hyoid bone. It passes behind the posterior surface of the body of the hyoid. It is separated from the hyoid bone by a mucous bursa, which allows for the upward movement of the larynx during swallowing.

Its middle thicker part is termed the median thyrohyoid ligament. Its lateral thinner portions are pierced by the superior laryngeal vessels and the internal branch of the superior laryngeal nerve. Its anterior surface is in relation with the thyrohyoid muscle, sternohyoid muscle, and omohyoid muscles, and with the body of the hyoid bone. It is pierced by the superior laryngeal nerve. It is also pierced the superior thyroid artery, where there is a thickening of the membrane.

== Clinical significance ==
=== Superior laryngeal artery ===
The thyrohyoid membrane needs to be manipulated to access the superior thyroid artery.

== History ==
The thyrohyoid membrane refers to the two structures it connects: the thyroid cartilage and the hyoid bone. It may also be known as the hyothyroid membrane, where the two structures are reversed.

== Additional images ==
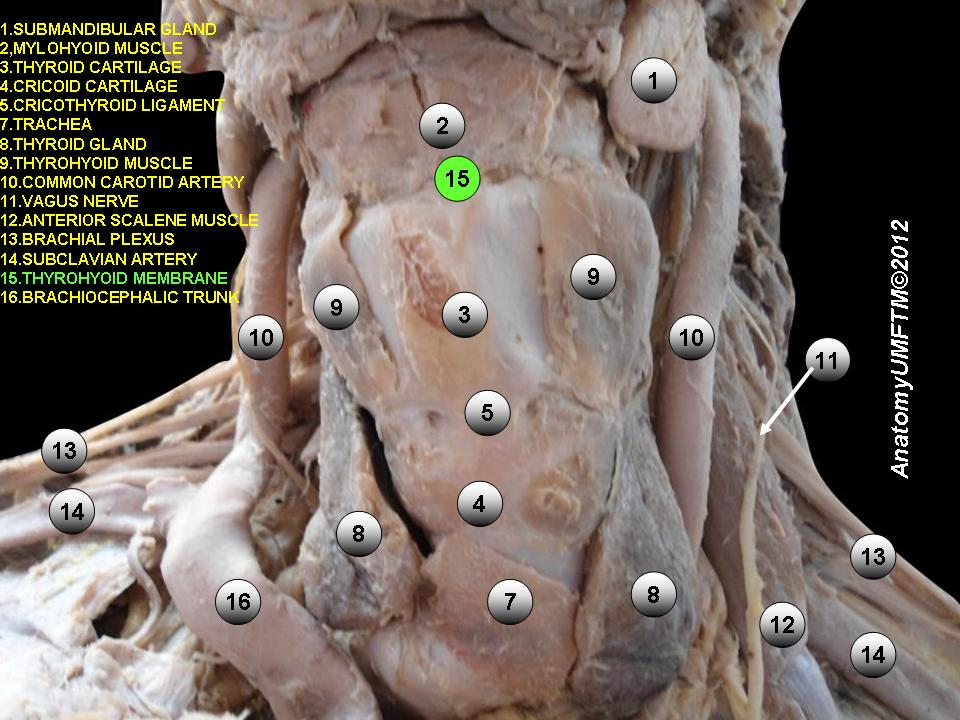
Thyrohyoid membrane

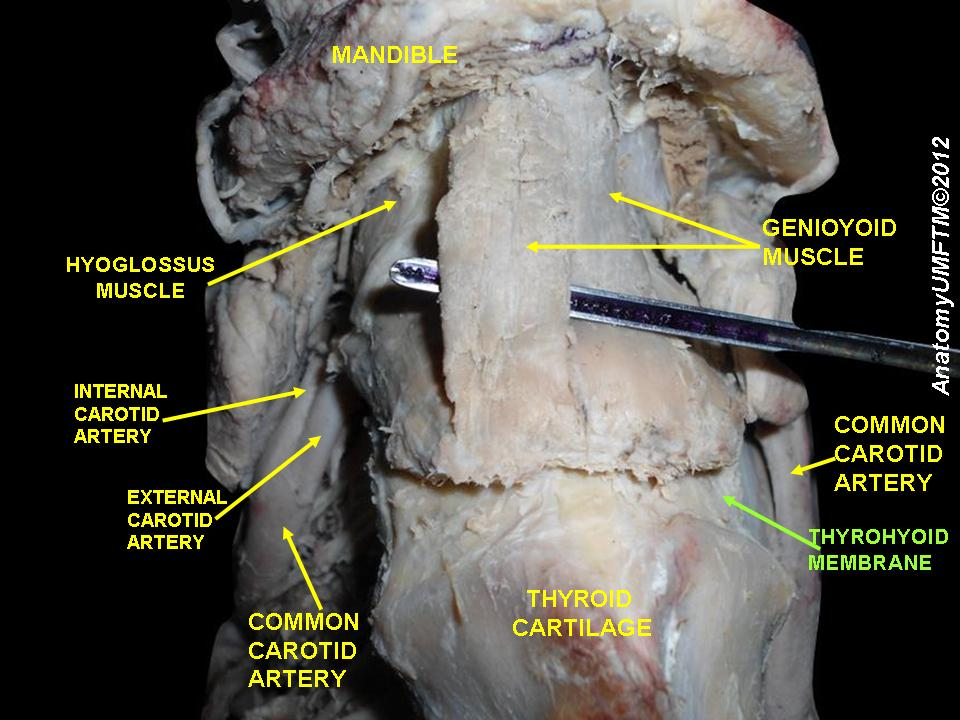
Thyrohyoid membrane

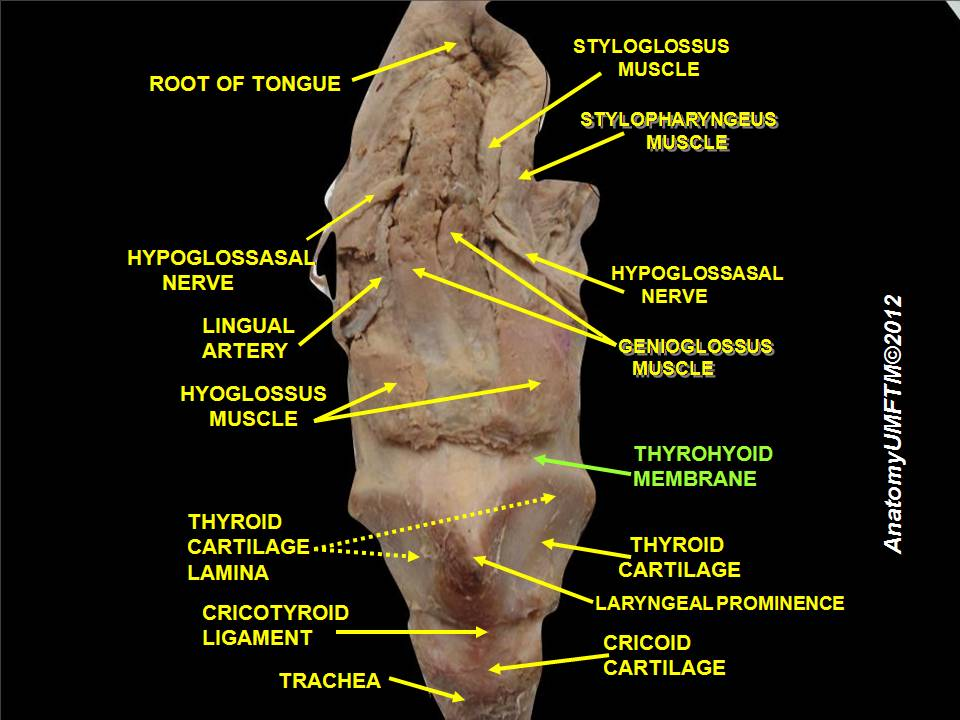
Thyrohyoid membrane

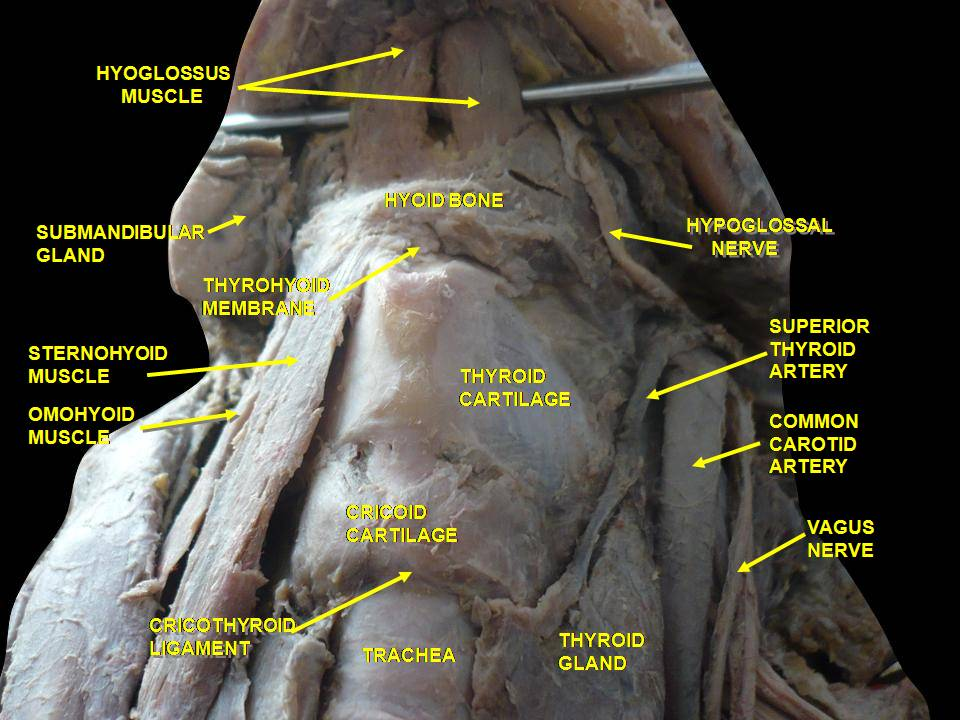
Muscles, nerves and arteries of neck. Deep dissection. Anterior view.
