= Thyroid cartilage =

Cartilage that makes up the laryngeal skeleton

- The cartilages of the larynx

Details
- Precursor: 4th and 6th branchial arch

Identifiers
- Latin: cartilago thyroidea
- MeSH: D013957
- TA98: A06.2.02.002
- TA2: 967
- FMA: 55099

The thyroid cartilage is the largest of the nine cartilages that make up the laryngeal skeleton, the cartilage structure in and around the trachea that contains the larynx. It does not completely encircle the larynx (only the cricoid cartilage encircles it).

== Structure ==
The thyroid cartilage is a hyaline cartilage structure that sits in front of the larynx and above the thyroid gland. The cartilage is composed of two halves, which meet in the middle at a peak called the laryngeal prominence, also called the Adam's apple, which is more prominent in males. In the midline above the prominence is the superior thyroid notch. A counterpart notch at the bottom of the cartilage is called the inferior thyroid notch.

The two halves of the cartilage that make out the outer surfaces extend obliquely to cover the sides of the trachea. The posterior edge of each half articulates with the cricoid cartilage inferiorly at a joint called the cricothyroid joint. The most posterior part of the cartilage also has two projections upwards and downwards. The upper projection is called the superior horn (cornu), and the lower is called the inferior horn. The superior horn is long and narrow, backward, and medialward, and ends in a conical extremity, which gives attachment to the lateral thyrohyoid ligament. The inferior horn is short and thick; it is directed downward, with a slight inclination forward and medialward, and presents, on the medial side of its tip, a small oval articular facet for articulation with the side of the cricoid cartilage.

The entire superior edge of the thyroid cartilage is attached to the hyoid bone by the thyrohyoid membrane. The thyroid cartilage is found between the levels of the C4 to C5 vertebrae.

The oblique line is a line on the thyroid cartilage. It marks the upper lateral borders of the thyroid gland. Two muscles originate along the line, the thyrohyoid muscle and the inferior pharyngeal constrictor. The sternothyroid inserts along the line.

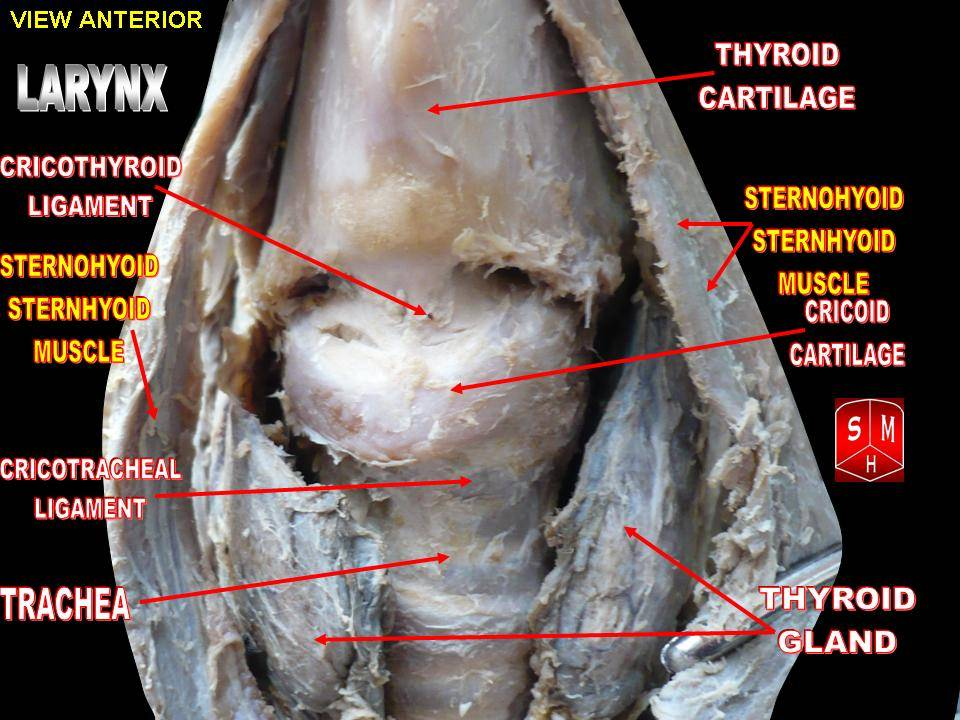
Thyroid cartilage

Movement of the cartilage at this joint produces a change in tension at the vocal folds, which in turn produces variation in voice.

=== Variations ===
The thyroid cartilage may contain a variant foramen, known as thyroid foramen, in up to 39% of individuals.

== Function ==
The thyroid cartilage forms the bulk of the front wall of the larynx. It protects the vocal folds ("vocal cords"), which are located directly behind it.

When the angle of the thyroid cartilage changes relative to the cricoid cartilage, this changes the pitch of voice.

The cartilage also serves as an attachment for several muscles.

== Etymology ==
=== Shield-like ===
The English term thyroid cartilage is derived from the Latin expression cartilago thyreoides. The latter is a translation of Ancient Greek χόνδρος θυρεοειδής, attested in the writings of the Greek physician Galen. The Latin word cartilago, as well as the Ancient Greek word χόνδρος, both mean cartilage, while the ancient Greek word θυρεοειδής means shield-like or shield-shaped. The latter compound is composed of Ancient Greek θυρεός, shield and εἶδος, form/shape. The Greeks used εἶδος in compounds to indicate a resemblance with the first part of the word.

The ancient Greek word θυρεός can be found in the Odyssey of Homer, and represented a large square stone that was put against the door to keep it shut. Those θυρεοί were eventually used by the Greek army as shields to protect themselves. This shield was adapted by Roman legions and referred to by them as a scutum. The Roman scutum was an oblong shield with an oval shape. Numerous shields were used by the Roman soldiers, such as the pelta, parma and clypeus. In contrast to the scutum, these shields were round. Despite these latter shields bearing a clear round shape, coinages like petalis cartilago, cartilago parmalis, and cartilago clypealis were coined for the thyroid cartilage. In 16th-century Italian anatomist Realdo Colombo's De re anatomica, besides the aforementioned incorrect petalis cartilago, correct forms like scutalis cartilago and scutiformis cartilago can be found, as the scutum is the real Roman pendant of the Greek θυρεός. The latter Latin expression can be found in its English form in medical dictionaries as scutiform cartilage, while the name of the shield itself, i.e. scutum, is still being mentioned as a synonym for the thyroid cartilage.

=== Spelling ===
In the various editions of the official Latin nomenclature (Nomina Anatomica, in 1998 rebaptized as Terminologia Anatomica), three different spellings can be found, i.e. cartilago thyreoidea. cartilago thyroidea and the previously mentioned cartilago thyreoides. The variant with the adjective thyreoidea (with the ending -ea) would be a faulty rendering of Ancient Greek θυρεοειδής in Latin. Greek compounds ending in -ειδής, when imported into Latin as a loanword, ended in -ides. In the 17th century the non-classical Latin form -ideus/-idea/ideum for Greek -ειδής/-ειδές came into use, mostly by French anatomist Jean Riolan the Younger. No Greek loanwords (originally -ειδής/-ειδές) ending in -ideus/-idea/-ideum exist in classical Latin, thereby making the -ideus/-idea/-ideum form non-Latinate in character. The first edition of the Jena Nomina Anatomica (JNA) contained the incorrect cartilago thyreoidea, but after a list of recommendations/corrections was made this was corrected in subsequent editions of the JNA.

The variant with thyroidea (omitting e after thyr) is a compromise for English-speaking anatomists, as they have difficulties pronouncing that specific combination of letters, forcing a greater resemblance between Latin and English orthography. Dorland's medical dictionary from 1948 already adopted this incorrect spelling with an erroneous reference to the official Basle Nomina Anatomica even before the nomenclature committee of the Nomina Anatomica officially approved this orthographic revision in its edition of 1961. The spelling without an e is commonly accepted in English but earlier works preferred the etymologically correct thyreoid cartilage. The official Latin veterinary nomenclature, Nomina Anatomica Veterinaria, has the form cartilago thyroidea, in common with the human Nomina Anatomica/Terminologia Anatomica, but allows (in contrast to the latter) cartilago thyreoidea as an alternative spelling.

=== Shield versus door ===
A mishap is the resemblance between Latin thyroidea and English thyroid on the one side and Ancient Greek θυροειδής on the other side, as the latter does not mean shield-like, but actually means like a door, derived from θύρα, door. Θυροειδής is however used in anatomic nomenclature in the expression θυροειδές τρῆμα (τρῆμα = hole, perforation, aperture), coined by the Greek physician Galen. Ancient Greek θύρα can be translated, besides the aforementioned door, as gate, entrance and opening. The Greek name θυροειδές τρῆμα for this opening between the os pubis and the os ischii, currently called obturator foramen, clearly originates from its being an opening (θύρα), while bearing no resemblance to a shield (θυρεός). The Latin translation foramen thyreoideum for θυροειδές τρῆμα by the 18th–19th-century German physician and anatomist Samuel Thomas von Sömmerring is clearly mistaken. The current foramen thyroideum of the Terminologia Anatomica is not a Latin translation of Galen's θυροειδές τρῆμα, but an orthographic revision of what was previously known in the Nomina Anatomica as foramen thyreoideum, an inconstantly present opening in the lamina of the thyroid cartilage.

== See also ==
- Cricoid
- Laryngeal prominence
- Larynx
- Phonation
- Thyroid cartilage reduction
- Vocal fold
