= Mucous gland =

Type of gland

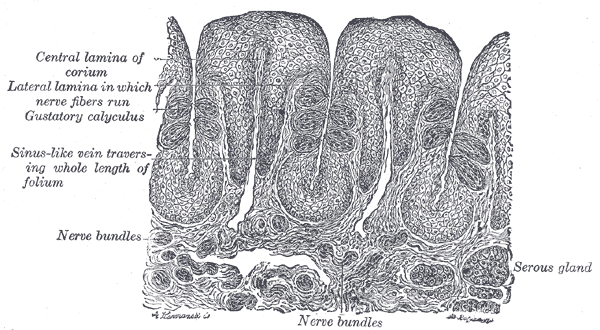
- Vertical section of foliate papilla of the rabbit, passing across the folia. (Serous gland labeled at bottom right.)

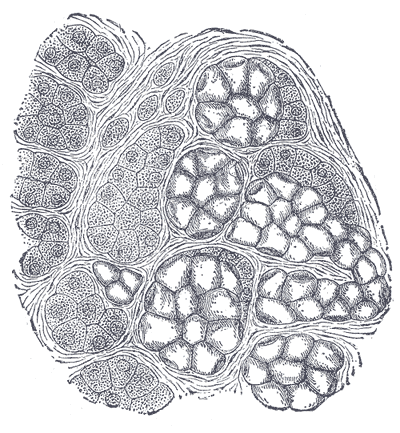
- Human submaxillary gland. At the right is a group of mucous alveoli, at the left a group of serous alveoli.

Details

Identifiers
- Latin: glandula mucosa
- TH: H2.00.02.0.03036
- FMA: 62888

Mucous glands, also known as muciparous glands, are found in several different parts of the body, and they typically stain lighter than serous glands during standard histological preparation. Most are multicellular, but goblet cells are single-celled glands.

== Mucous salivary glands ==
The mucous salivary glands are similar in structure to the buccal and labial glands.

They are found especially at the back part behind the vallate papillae, but are also present at the apex and marginal parts.

In this connection, the anterior lingual glands require special notice.

They are situated on the under surface of the apex of the tongue, one on either side of the frenulum, where they are covered by a fascicle of muscular fibers derived from the styloglossus and inferior longitudinal muscles. They produce a glycoprotein, mucin that absorbs water to form a sticky secretion called mucus.

They are from 12 to 25 mm. long, and about 8 mm. broad, and each opens by three or four ducts on the under surface of the apex.

The Weber's glands are an example of muciparous glands located along the tongue.

== See also ==
- Mucus
- Gland
- Exocrine gland
- Weber's glands
