= Blandin (surname) =

Blandin is a surname. Notable people with the surname include:

- Amos Noyes Blandin Jr. (1896–1982), Justice of the New Hampshire Supreme Court
- Eric Blandin (fl. 1990s–2020s), French aerodynamicist
- Ernie Blandin (1919–1968), American football tackle
- J. P. Blandin (fl. 1980s–2010s), American college baseball coach and former pitcher
- Marie-Christine Blandin (born 1952), member of the Senate of France
- Philippe-Frédéric Blandin (1798–1849), French surgeon
- William Grant Blandin, birth name of Romaine Fielding (1867–1927), American actor, screenwriter, and silent film director

== See also ==
- Blendin Blenjamin Blandin, a recurring character in the animated TV series Gravity Falls
- Blanding (disambiguation)
- Blandón
