= Longitudinal muscle of tongue =

Longitudinal muscle of tongue may refer to:

- Inferior longitudinal muscle of tongue
- Superior longitudinal muscle of tongue
