= Anterior lingual glands =

Glands located near the tip of the tongue

Anterior lingual glands (also called apical glands) are deeply placed seromucous glands that are located near the tip of the tongue on each side of the frenulum linguae. They are found on the under surface of the apex of the tongue, and are covered by a bundle of muscular fibers derived from the styloglossus and longitudinalis inferior. They are between 12 and 25 mm (0.47 and 0.98 in) in length, and approximately 8 mm (0.31 in) wide, and each opens by three or four ducts on the under surface of the tongue's apex.

The anterior lingual glands are sometimes referred by eponymous names such as:

- Bauhin's glands: Named after Swiss anatomist Gaspard Bauhin (1560–1624).
- Blandin's glands: Named after French surgeon Philippe-Frédéric Blandin (1798-1849).
- Nuhn's glands: Named after German anatomist Anton Nuhn (1815–1889).
