= Lorna Norori =

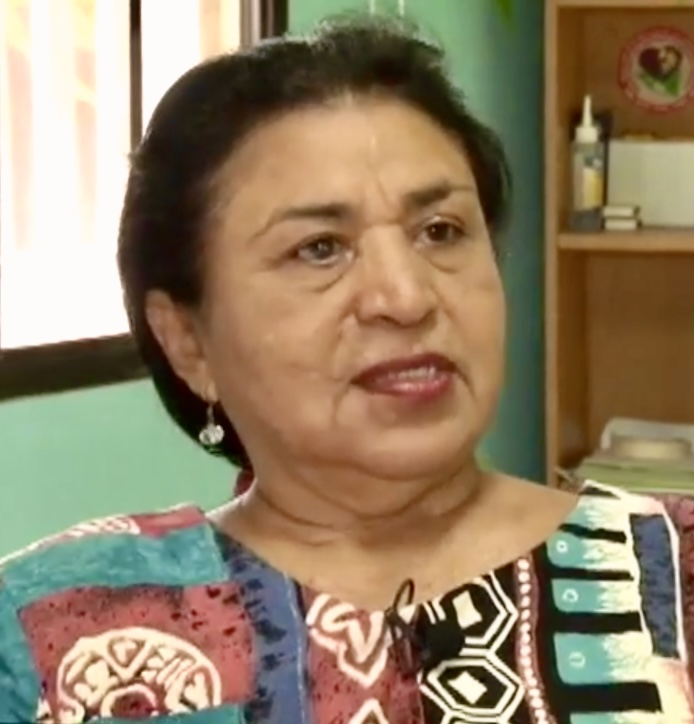
- Norori in 2017

Lorna Norori is a Nicaraguan women's rights activist, psychologist, coordinator of the Movimiento contra el Abuso Sexual (Movement Against Sexual Violence), commonly known as MCAS.

== Career ==
Norori works in the Nicaraguan Women's Network Against Violence, which helps victims who are often subject to various pressures from secular and church authorities. In 2008, abortion laws were tightened in Nicaragua, which made it possible to arrest women who decided to terminate the pregnancy. At the same time, the country has one of the highest rates of violence against children in the world.

On 30 October 2009, Norori, María Blandón and seven other community activists were arrested by police for their involvement in the rape and pregnancy case of a nine-year-old girl named Rosita in Costa Rica. Norori, along with other activists, helped the girl's parents to find a safe abortion in the country or abroad. The activists are threatened with a lawsuit. According to Amnesty International, this is a method of discouraging further action against the current policy of the authorities and for the rights of women and children. Norori is opposed to the frequent forcing of girls under the age of 15 to bear children when they are raped by law. According to MCAS data, around 40 percent of rape victims in Nicaragua do not have access to legal support.
