= Chondroglossus =

Muscle of the tongue

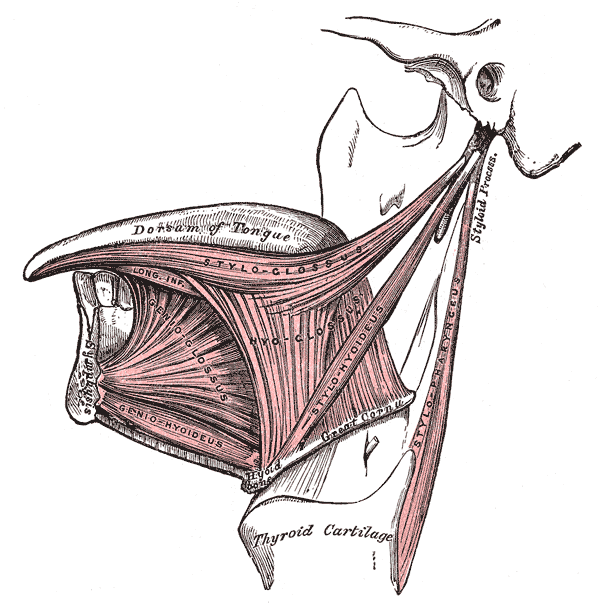
- Extrinsic muscles of the tongue. Left side.

Details
- Origin: Lesser horn of hyoid bone
- Insertion: Intrinsic muscles of tongue
- Nerve: Hypoglossal nerve
- Actions: Assists hyoglossus in depressing tongue

Identifiers
- Latin: musculus chondroglossus
- TA98: A05.1.04.103
- TA2: 2119
- FMA: 46700

The chondroglossus muscle is a muscle of the tongue. It arises from the medial side of the lesser horn of the hyoid bone, before blending with intrinsic muscles of the tongue. It is supplied by the hypoglossal nerve.

== Structure ==
The chondroglossus muscle is about 2 cm long. It arises from the medial side and base of the lesser horn of the hyoid bone. It passes directly upward. It then inserts by blending with the intrinsic muscles of the tongue, between the hyoglossus and genioglossus.

The chondroglossus muscle is sometimes described as a part of the hyoglossus. However, is separated from it by fibers of the genioglossus, which pass to the side of the pharynx.

=== Nerve supply ===
The chondroglossus muscle is supplied by the first lateral branch of the hypoglossal nerve. Some studies have found that it does not contain proprioceptive spindles to determine stretch.

== Clinical significance ==
The chondroglossus muscle may be cut in the suprahyoid release surgery, which can be used during resection of the trachea.

== Additional images ==
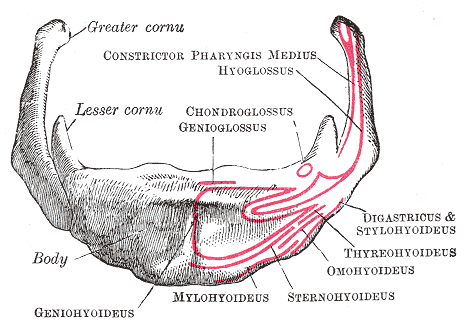
Hyoid bone. Anterior surface. Enlarged.
