= Georg Öhngren =

Swedish otolaryngologist (1891–1975)

Liss Oskar Georg Öhngren (September 20, 1891 – November 16, 1975) was an otolaryngologist and head and neck surgeon, and head of his department at the Sabbatsberg Hospital in Stockholm, Sweden. He is best known for defining the Öhngren's line in a paper published in 1933. In the paper, he describes 187 cases of cancer of the paranasal sinuses and how their prognosis was worse if the tumor stretched behind an imaginary line from the medial canthus and the ipsilateral angle of the mandible. This classification holds value to this day.
