= Stylohyoid ligament =

Ligament

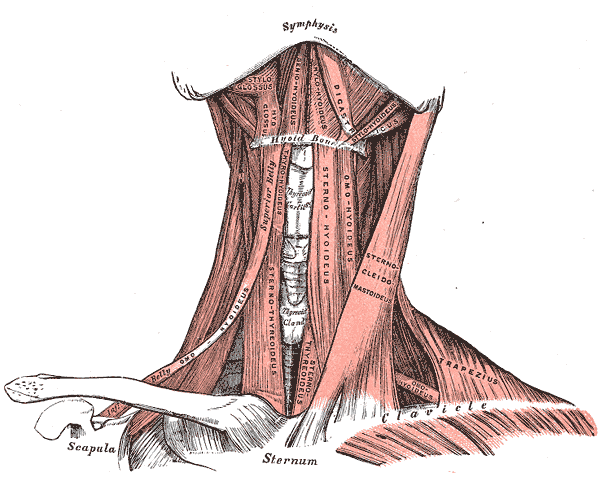
- Muscles of the neck. Anterior view.

Details
- From: Styloid process (temporal)
- To: Hyoid bone

Identifiers
- Latin: ligamentum stylohyoideum
- TA98: A03.1.01.003
- TA2: 1567
- FMA: 72308

The stylohyoid ligament is a ligament that extends between the hyoid bone, and the temporal styloid process (of the temporal bone of the skull).

== Anatomy ==
=== Attachments ===
It attaches at the lesser horn of the hyoid bone inferiorly, and (the apex of) the styloid process of the temporal bone superiorly.

The ligament gives attachment to the superior-most fibres of the middle pharyngeal constrictor muscle.

=== Relations ===
The ligament is adjacent to the lateral wall of the oropharynx.

Inferiorly, it is adjacent to the hyoglossus.

== Clinical significance ==
The stylohyoid ligament frequently contains a little cartilage in its center, which is sometimes partially ossified in Eagle syndrome.

== Other animals ==
In many animals, the epihyal is a distinct bone in the centre of the stylohyoid ligament, similar to that seen in Eagle syndrome.

== Additional images ==
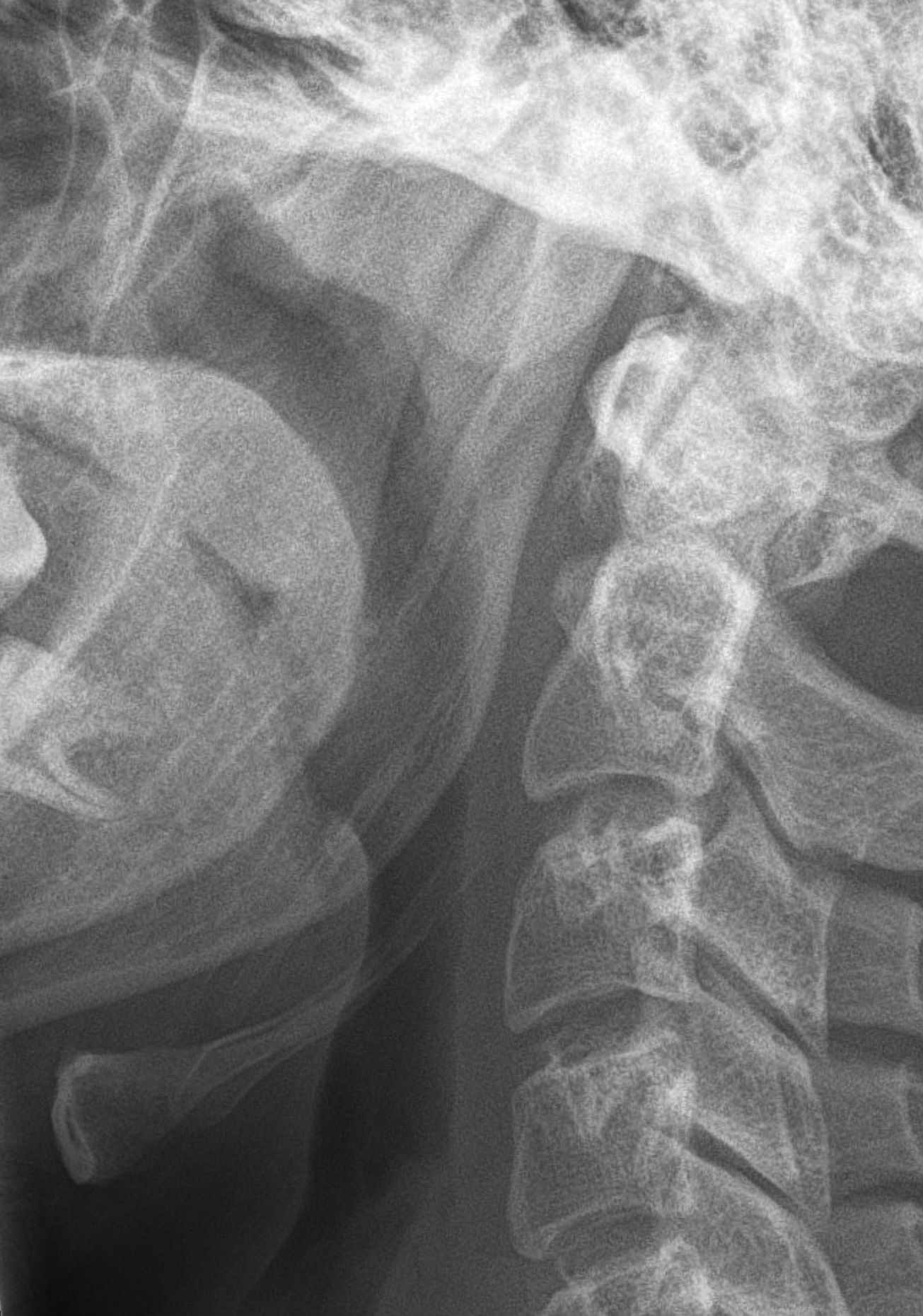
Ossified stylohyoid ligament or elongated styloid process
