= Angle of the mandible =

Part of the mandible bone

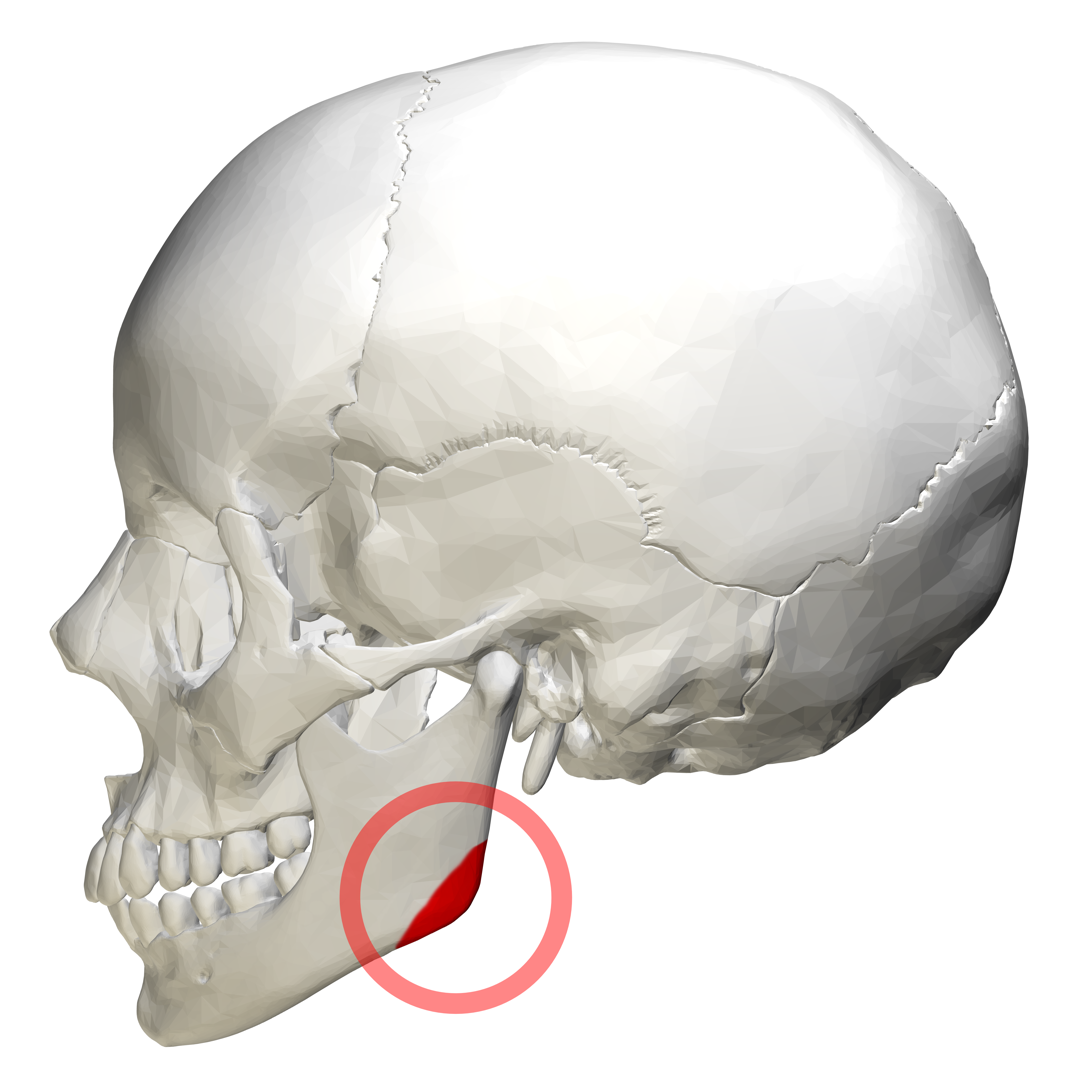
- Human skull. Position of angle of the mandible shown in red.

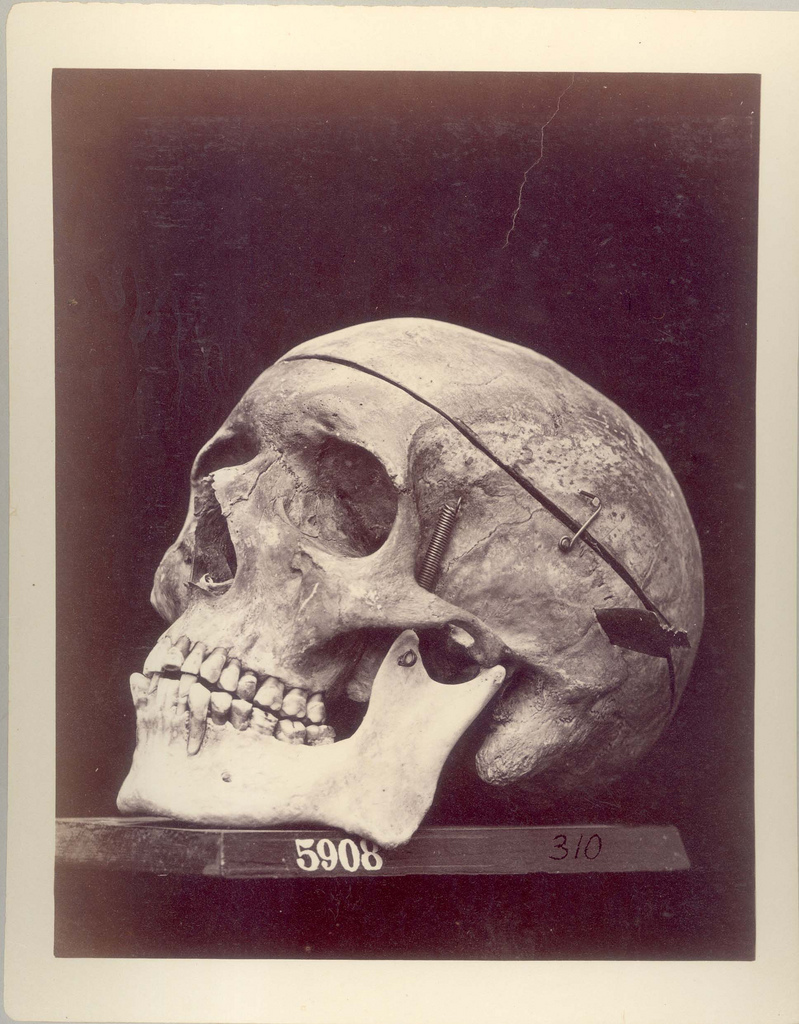
- 1870s American male skull. The angle of the mandible is visible just above the white number.

Details

Identifiers
- Latin: angulus mandibulae
- TA98: A02.1.15.025
- TA2: 861
- FMA: 59459

The angle of the mandible (a.k.a. gonial angle, Masseteric Tuberosity, and Masseteric Insertion) is located at the posterior border at the junction of the lower border of the ramus of the mandible.

The angle of the mandible, which may be either inverted or everted, is marked by rough, oblique ridges on each side, for the attachment of the masseter laterally, and the pterygoideus internus (medial pterygoid muscle) medially; the stylomandibular ligament is attached to the angle between these muscles.

The forensic term for the midpoint of the mandibular angle is the gonion. The gonion is a cephalometric landmark located at the lowest, posterior, and lateral point on the angle. This site is at the apex of the maximum curvature of the mandible, where the ascending ramus becomes the body of the mandible.

The mandibular angle has been named as a forensic tool for gender determination, but some studies have called into question whether there is any significant sex difference in humans in the angle.

Many mammals have a distinctive bony prong, the angular process, immediately above the angle of the mandible.

== See also ==
- Ohngren's line

== Additional images ==
Position of angle of the mandible (shown in red). Animation.

Mandible bone. Position of angle shown in red.

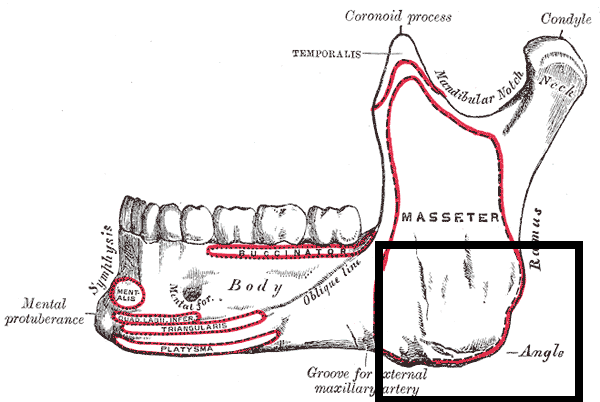
Mandible. Outer surface. Side view. (Angle labeled at bottom right.)

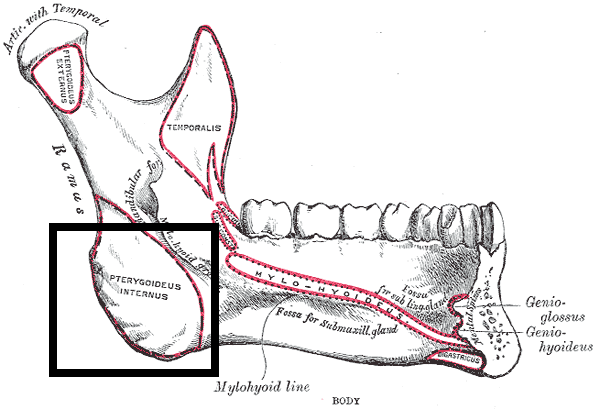
Mandible. Inner surface. Side view. (Angle visible at bottom left.)

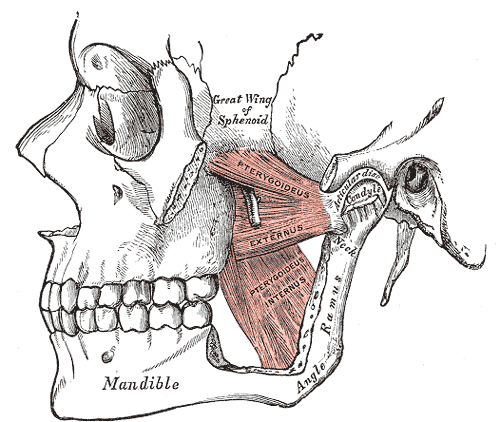
The Pterygoidei; the zygomatic arch and a portion of the ramus of the mandible have been removed.

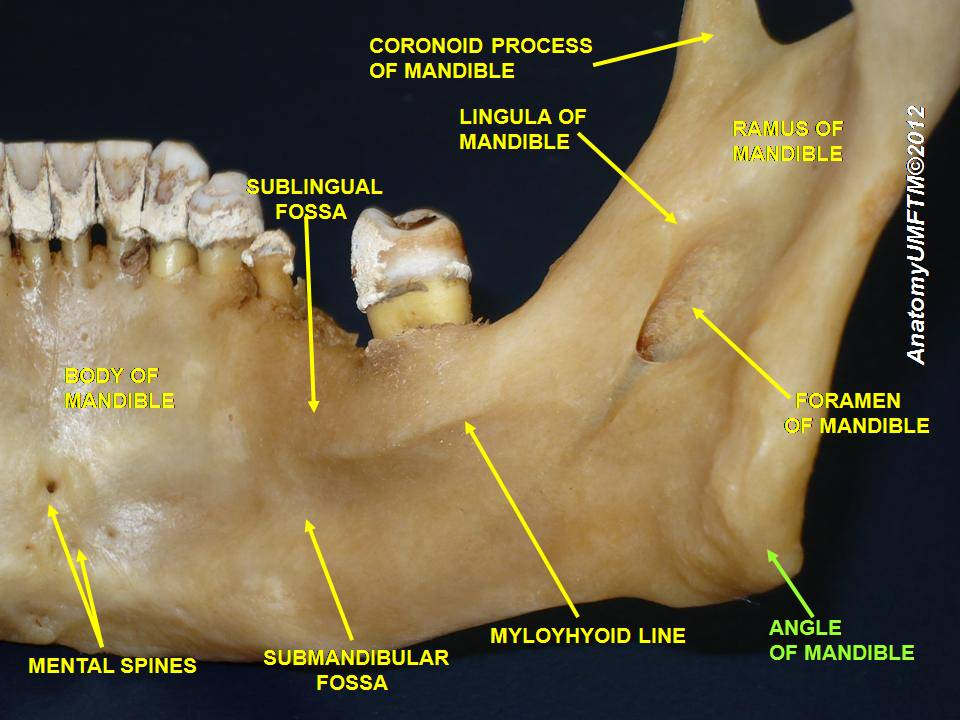
Mandible. Inner surface. Angle of mandible labeled at bottom right.
