= Anton Nuhn =

German anatomist

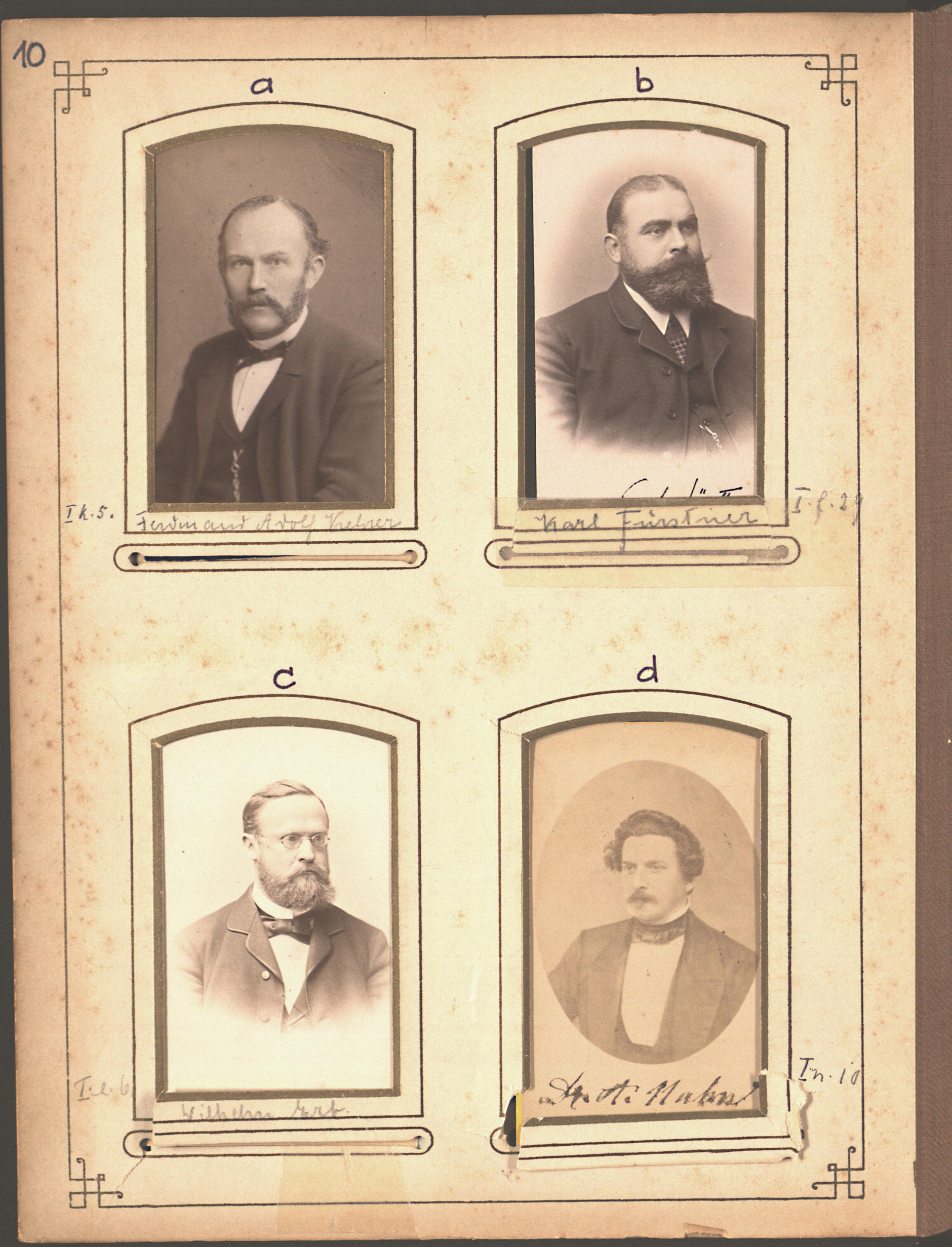
University of Heidelberg physicians, Nuhn at lower right

Anton Nuhn (21 June 1814, Schriesheim, Baden – 27 June 1889) was a German anatomist.

He studied medicine at the University of Heidelberg, where he was a student of Friedrich Tiedemann (1781–1861). In 1842 he was a lecturer at Heidelberg, and shortly afterwards worked as prosector. In 1849 he became an associate professor at the institute of anatomy in Heidelberg, and in 1872 received the title of honorary professor.

"Nuhn's glands", also known as anterior lingual glands, are named after him. They are described as small, deeply placed seromucous glands located near the tip of the tongue on each side of the frenulum.

His most popular written work was an 1878 textbook on comparative anatomy titled Lehrbuch der vergleichenden Anatomie.
