= Blandón =

Blandón is a Spanish surname.

== Geographical distribution ==
As of 2014, 52.4% of all known bearers of the surname Blandón were residents of Nicaragua (frequency 1:162), 37.7% of Colombia (1:1,787), 2.9% of the United States (1:176,392), 1.5% of Costa Rica (1:4,518), 1.2% of Honduras (1:10,385) and 1.0% of Spain (1:67,619).

In Spain, the frequency of the surname was higher than average (1:67,619) in the following regions:

1. Basque Country (1:31,778)
2. Andalusia (1:33,697)
3. Aragon (1:44,251)
4. Navarre (1:53,051)
5. Community of Madrid (1:60,440)

In Nicaragua, the frequency of the surname was higher than average (1:162) in the following departments:

1. Jinotega (1:38)
2. Estelí (1:61)
3. Matagalpa (1:69)
4. North Caribbean Coast (1:123)
5. Nueva Segovia (1:146)

In Colombia, the frequency of the surname was higher than average (1:1,787) in the following departments:

1. Chocó (1:291)
2. Caldas (1:420)
3. Risaralda (1:500)
4. Antioquia (1:554)
5. Quindío (1:748)

== People ==
- Eduardo Blandón (born 1985), Colombian footballer
- Irís Marina Montenegro Blandón (born 1950), Nicaraguan politician
- Jimmy Blandón (born 1969) Ecuadorian footballer
- María Teresa Blandón (born 1961), Nicaraguan sociologist, feminist and former revolutionary guerilla
- Oscar Danilo Blandón (born 1952) Nicaraguan government official under Anastasio Somoza
- Regina Blandón (born 1990) Mexican actress
- Roberto Blandón (born 1961) Mexican actor
- Kim Blandón (born 1996) Civil Rights Community Organizer.
