= Ohngren's line =

In head and neck cancer, Ohngren's line is a line that connects the medial canthus of the eye to the angle of the mandible.

The line defines a plane orthogonal to a sagittal plane that divides the maxillary sinus into (1) an anterior-inferior part, and (2) a superior-posterior part. Tumours that arise in the anterior-inferior part, i.e. below Ohngren's line, generally have a better prognosis than those in the other group. Addition to above a vertical line through pupil is also considered, which divides the above-mentioned structures into 4 different regions. The structures at posterosuperior medial have worst prognosis and that at anteroinferior medial are least dangerous.
