= Hyoid bone fracture =

- Specialty: Orthopedics

The hyoid bone fracture is a very rare fracture of the hyoid bone, accounting for 0.002% of all fractures in humans. It is commonly associated with strangulation and rarely occurs in isolation. The fracture may be associated with gunshot injury, car accidents or induced vomiting. In 50% of strangulations and 27% of hangings, hyoid fractures occur.

== Signs and symptoms ==
The main symptoms of a hyoid bone fracture include pain when the affected person rotates their neck, trouble swallowing (dysphagia), and painful swallowing (odynophagia). Other symptoms can be crepitus or tenderness over the bone, suffocation when sticking out the tongue, dyspnea, dysphonia, and subcutaneous emphysema. On laryngoscope examination, lacerations on the pharynx, bruises, swelling, and hyoid bone fragments can be seen. If the hyoid bone is fractured, there is a high likelihood that the larynx, pharynx, mandible, and cervical spine may be injured as well. Common co-occurring injuries include Le Fort III fractures, mandibular or cervical vertebra fractures, and mandibular dislocation.

== Causes ==
Position of hyoid bone (shown in red)

Shape of hyoid bone

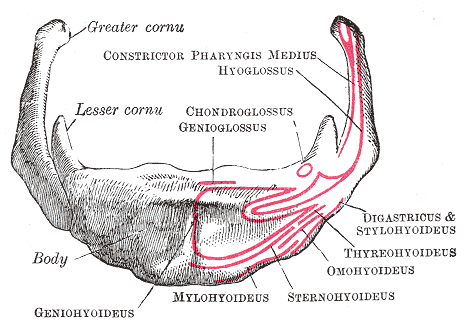
Hyoid bone—anterior surface, enlarged

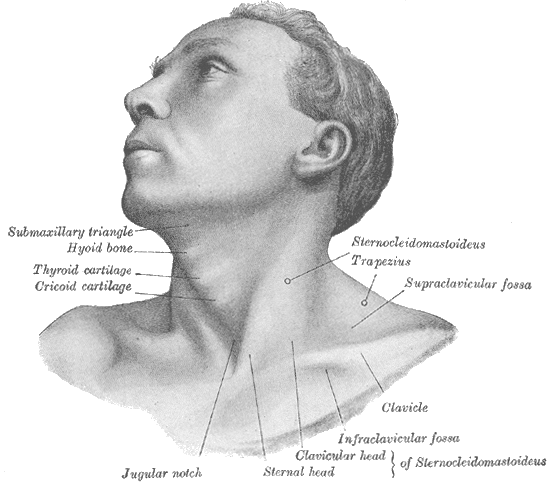
Anterolateral view of head and neck

Neck trauma, commonly by strangulation, athletic activities, and car accidents, is the cause of a hyoid bone fracture. Other causes include violent vomiting, gunshot wounds, and hanging.

== Diagnosis ==
A diagnosis can be made using clinical examination, laryngoscope examination, and radiographic studies.

=== Classification ===
Hyoid bone fractures are classified into three different types:

- Inward compression fractures with outside periosteal tears
- Antero-posterior compression fractures with inside periosteal tears
- Avulsion fractures

== Treatment ==
Treatment options vary from very conservative to aggressive. Conservative options include rest, observation, pain control, diet changes, use of a nasopharyngeal tube or oropharyngeal tube, and antibiotic therapy. More aggressive options include surgical repair of the hyoid bone and tracheotomy. Surgical treatment was used in 10.9% of cases in a 2012 meta-analysis.

== Epidemiology ==
Hyoid bone fractures represent 0.002% of all fractures; they are rare because the hyoid bone is well-protected by its location in the neck behind the mandible and in front of the cervical spine, as well as its mobility.
