= Temporal styloid process =

Part of the temporal bone

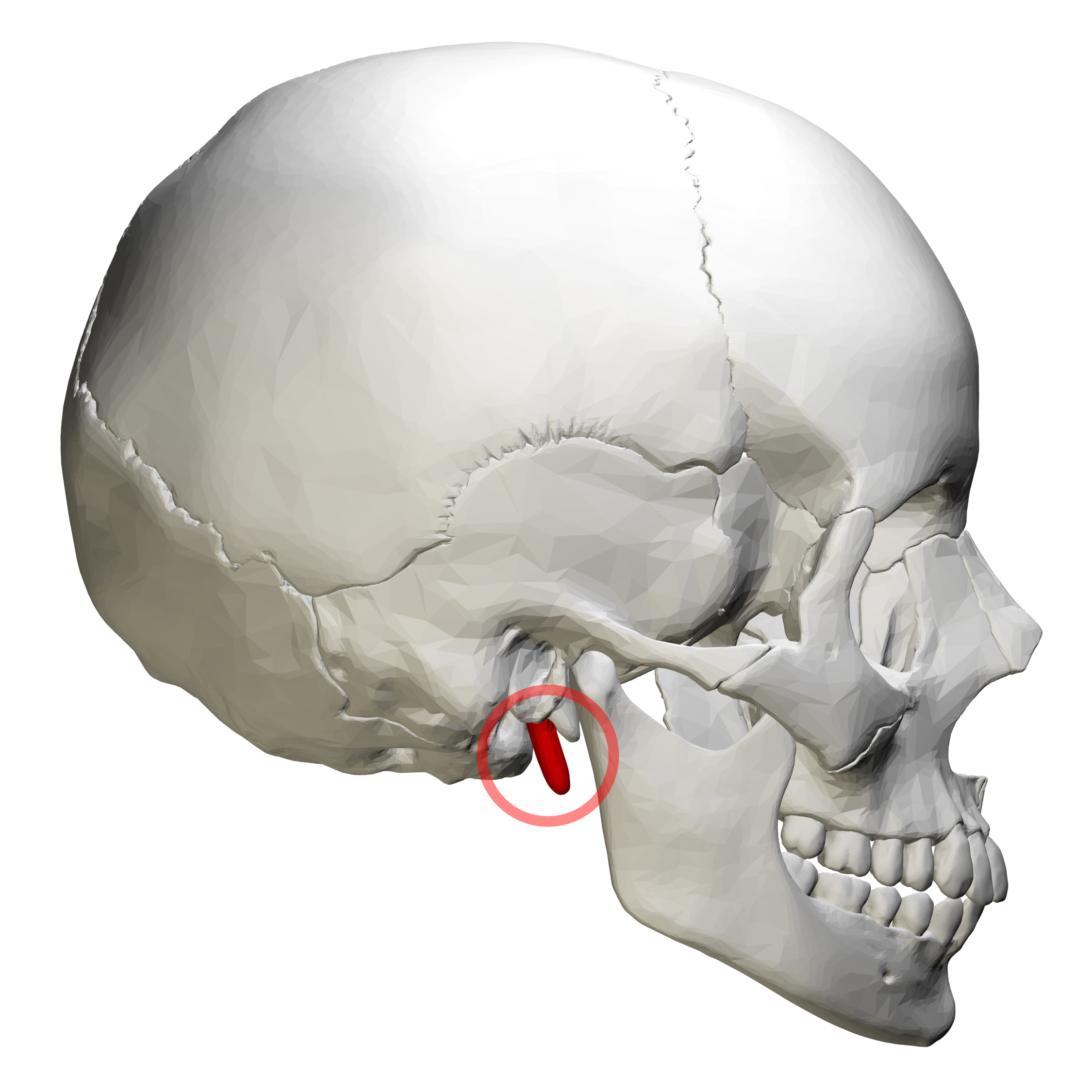
- Right side of the skull. Styloid process shown in red

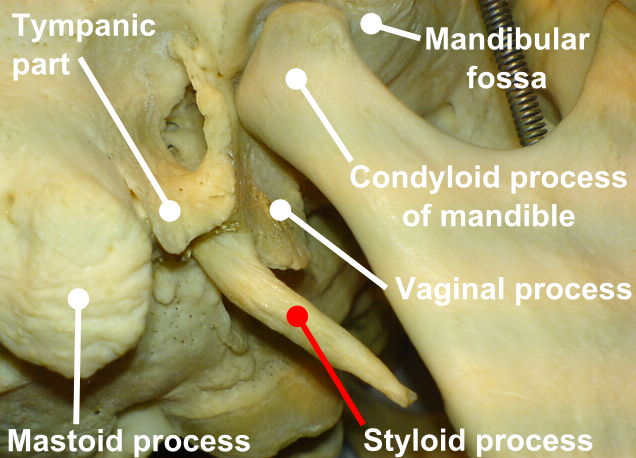
- Right temporal bone and mandible (styloid process labeled at bottom)

Details

Identifiers
- Latin: processus styloideus ossis temporalis
- TA98: A02.1.06.047
- TA2: 683
- FMA: 52877

The temporal styloid process is a slender bony process of the temporal bone extending downward and forward from the undersurface of the temporal bone just below the ear. The styloid process gives attachments to several muscles, and ligaments.

== Structure ==
The styloid process is a slender and pointed bony process of the temporal bone projecting anteroinferiorly from the inferior surface of the temporal bone just below the ear. Its length normally ranges from just under 3 cm to just over 4 cm. It is usually nearly straight, but may be curved in some individuals.

Its proximal (tympanohyal) part is ensheathed by the tympanic part of the temporal bone (vaginal process), whereas its distal (stylohyal) part gives attachment to several structures.

=== Attachments ===
The styloid process gives attachments to several muscles, and ligaments. It serves as an anchor point for several muscles associated with the tongue and larynx.

- stylohyoid ligament
- stylomandibular ligament
- styloglossus muscle (innervated by the hypoglossal nerve)
- stylohyoid muscle (innervated by the facial nerve)
- stylopharyngeus muscle (innervated by the glossopharyngeal nerve)

=== Relations ===
The parotid gland is situated laterally to the styloid process, the external carotid artery passes by its apex, the facial nerve crosses its base, and the attachment of the stylopharyngeus muscle separates it from the internal jugular vein medially.

== Development ==
The styloid process arises from endochondral ossification of the cartilage from the second pharyngeal arch (Reichert's cartilage). It arises from fusion of dorsal and ventral components of the arch.

== Clinical significance ==
A small percentage of the population will suffer from an elongation of the styloid process and stylohyoid ligament calcification. This condition is also known as Eagle syndrome. The tissues in the throat rub on the styloid process during the act of swallowing with resulting pain along the glossopharyngeal nerve. There is also pain upon turning the head or extending the tongue. Other symptoms may include voice alteration, cough, dizziness, migraines, occipital neuralgia, pain in teeth and jaw and sinusitis or bloodshot eyes.

== In other animals ==
The styloid process is present across mammals.

The origin of the structure that would become the styloid process is in Reichert's cartilage, which makes up the second branchial arch in ancestral vertebrates. In gnathostomes, this cartilage separated into two discrete elements: the hyomandibula and the ceratohyal. The hyomandibula in turn evolved into two discrete elements in basal amniotes: the columella and the extracolumella (believed to be equivalent to the mammalian tympanohyal), while the ceratohyal evolved into the mammalian stylohyal. Developmental evidence suggests that the styloid process evolved from a fusion of the tympanohyal and the stylohyal.

== Additional images ==
Animation. Temporal styloid process shown in red.

Left temporal bone.

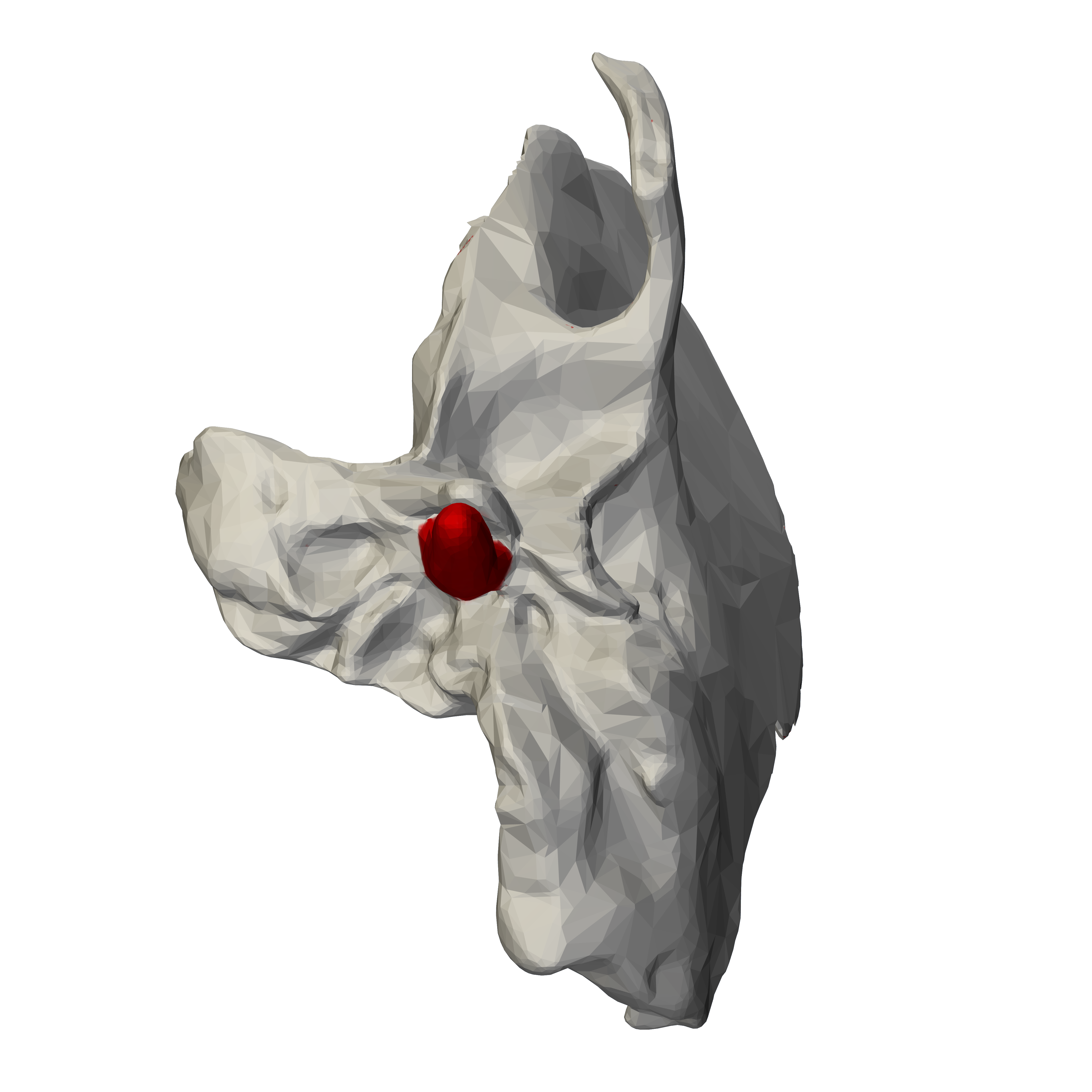
Inferior surface of left temporal bone. Styloid process shown in red.

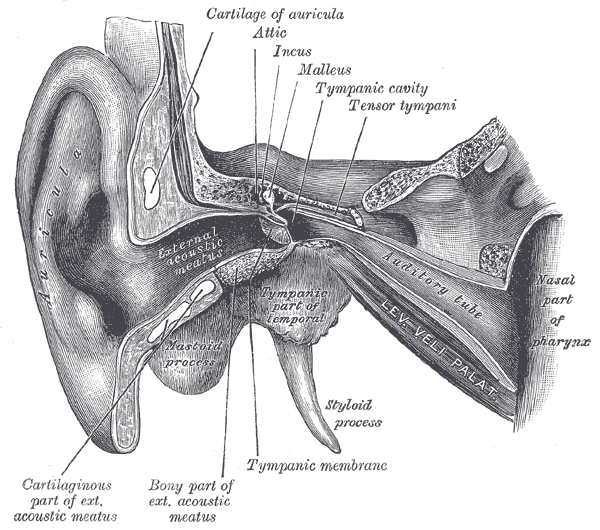
External and middle ear, opened from the front. Right side. (Label for styloid process is bottom center.)

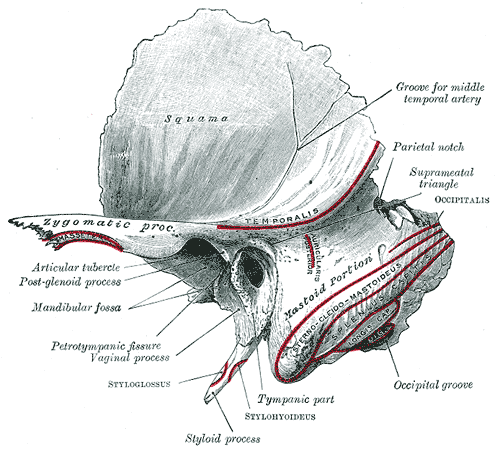
Left temporal bone. Outer surface. (Styloid process visible at center bottom.)

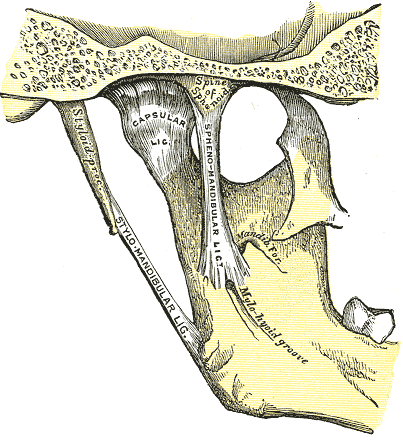
Articulation of the mandible. Medial aspect.

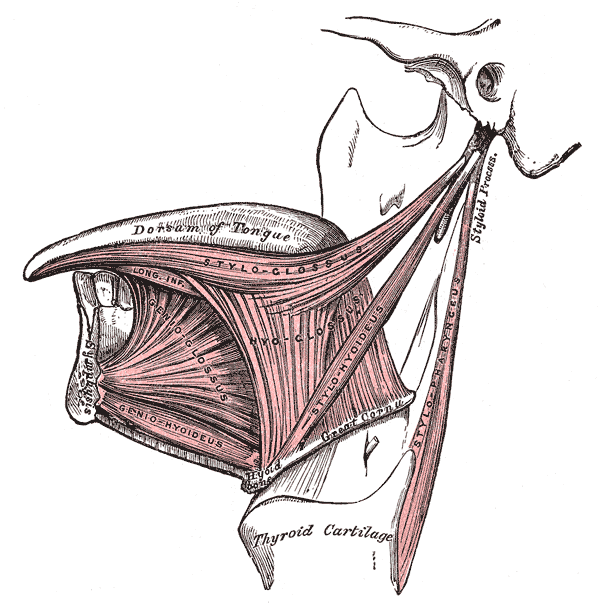
Extrinsic muscles of the tongue. Left side.

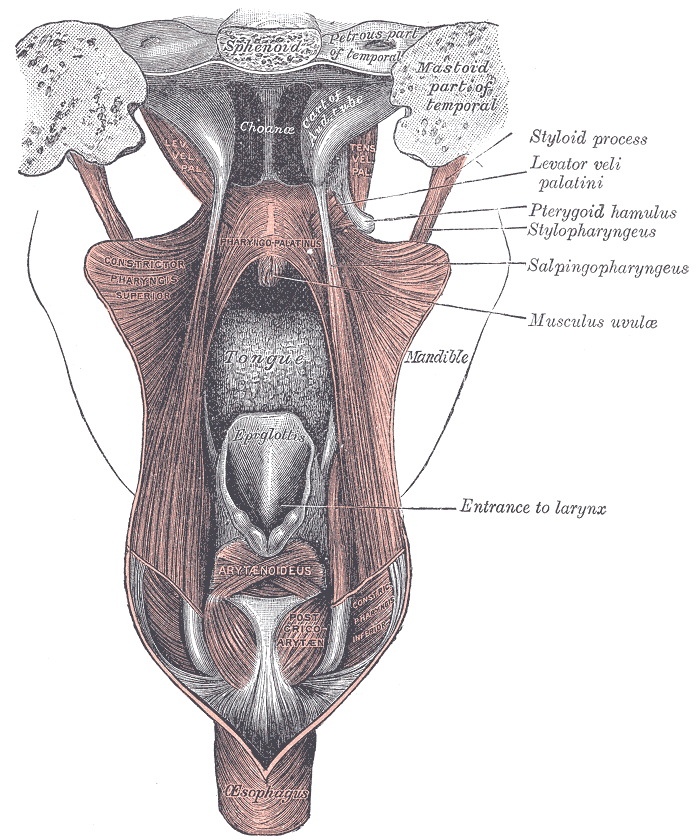
Dissection of the muscles of the palate from behind.

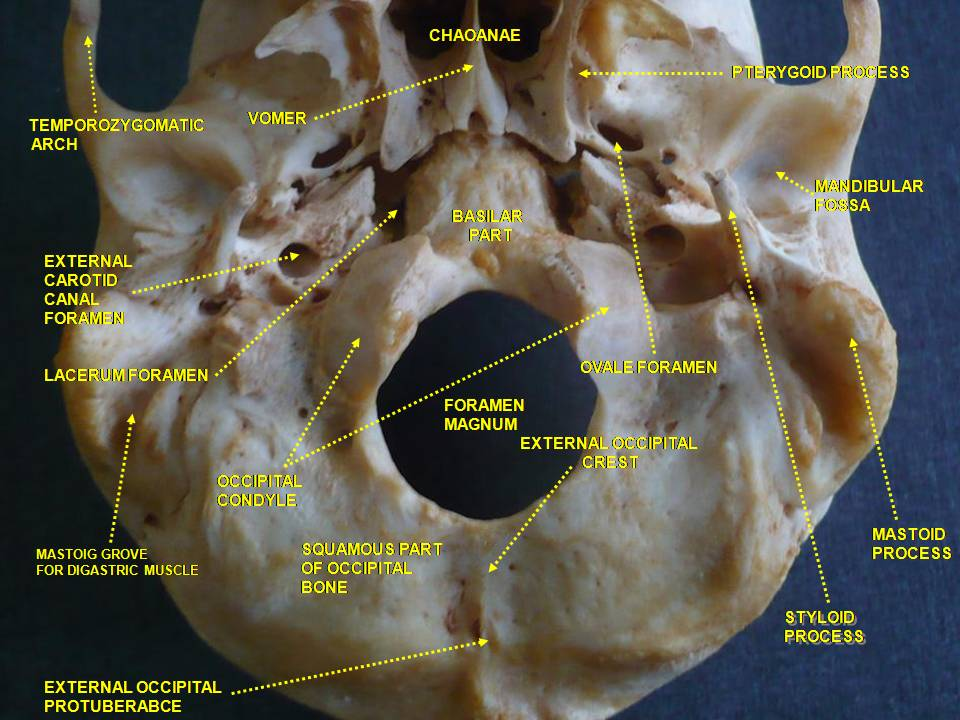
Styloid process. Base of skull.
