= Stylomandibular ligament =

Ligament between the jaw bone and the skull

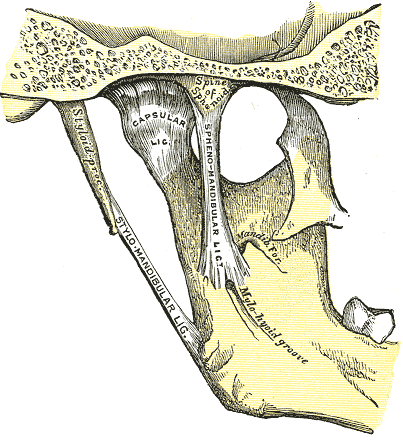
- Articulation of the mandible. Medial aspect. (Stylomandibular lig. labeled at center left.)

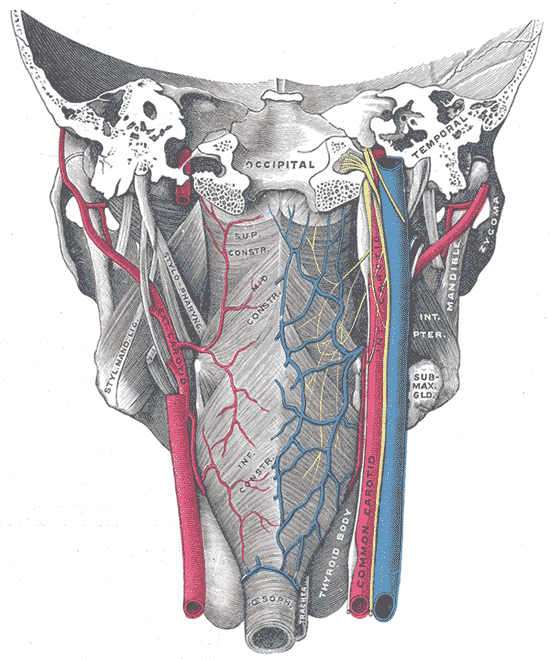
- Muscles of the pharynx, viewed from behind, together with the associated vessels and nerves. (Styl. mand. lig. labeled at center left.)

Details
- System: skeletal
- From: styloid process (temporal)
- To: ramus of the mandible

Identifiers
- Latin: ligamentum stylomandibulare
- TA98: A03.1.07.008
- TA2: 1569
- FMA: 57083

The stylomandibular ligament is the thickened posterior portion of the investing cervical fascia around the neck. It extends from near the apex of the styloid process of the temporal bone to the angle and posterior border of the angle of the mandible, between the masseter muscle and medial pterygoid muscle. The stylomandibular ligament limits mandibular movements, such as preventing excessive opening.

== Structure ==
The stylomandibular ligament extends from near the apex of the styloid process of the temporal bone to the angle and posterior border of the angle of the mandible, between the masseter muscle and medial pterygoid muscle. From its deep surface, some fibers of the styloglossus muscle originate. Although classed among the ligaments of the temporomandibular joint, it can only be considered as accessory to it.

== Function ==
The stylomandibular ligament, along with the sphenomandibular ligament, limits mandibular movements, such as preventing excessive opening.

== Clinical significance ==
The stylomandibular ligament is important for maintaining stability of the mandible after maxillofacial surgery.
