= Weber's glands =

Salivary gland of the tongue

The Weber's glands are muciparous glands on the side of the tongue. They are a minor salivary gland in the peritonsillar space. The glands are named after German anatomist Moritz Ignaz Weber. They clear the peritonsillar space of debris.
