= Superior longitudinal muscle of tongue =

Intrinsic muscle of the tongue

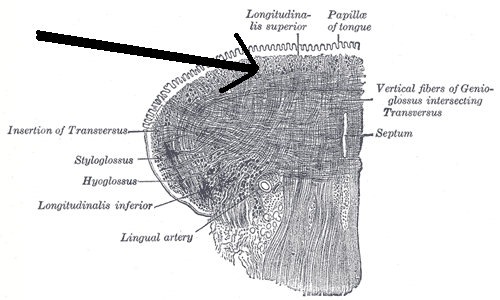
- A coronal section of tongue, showing intrinsic muscles.

Details
- Origin: Close to epiglottis, from median fibrous septum
- Insertion: Edges of tongue
- Nerve: Hypoglossal nerve (CN XII)
- Actions: Retracts tongue with inferior longitudinal muscle, making tongue short and thick

Identifiers
- Latin: musculus longitudinalis superior linguae
- TA98: A05.1.04.106
- TA2: 2122
- FMA: 46693

The superior longitudinal muscle of tongue or superior lingualis is a thin layer of oblique and longitudinal fibers immediately underlying the mucous membrane on the dorsum of the tongue.

== Structure ==
The superior longitudinal muscle of the tongue is one of the intrinsic muscles of the tongue. It arises from the submucous fibrous layer close to the epiglottis and from the median fibrous septum, and runs forward to the edges of the tongue.

=== Nerve supply ===
The superior longitudinal muscle of the tongue is supplied by the hypoglossal nerve (CN XII).

== Function ==
The superior longitudinal muscle of the tongue works with the other intrinsic muscles to move the tongue.
