= Philippe-Frédéric Blandin =

French surgeon

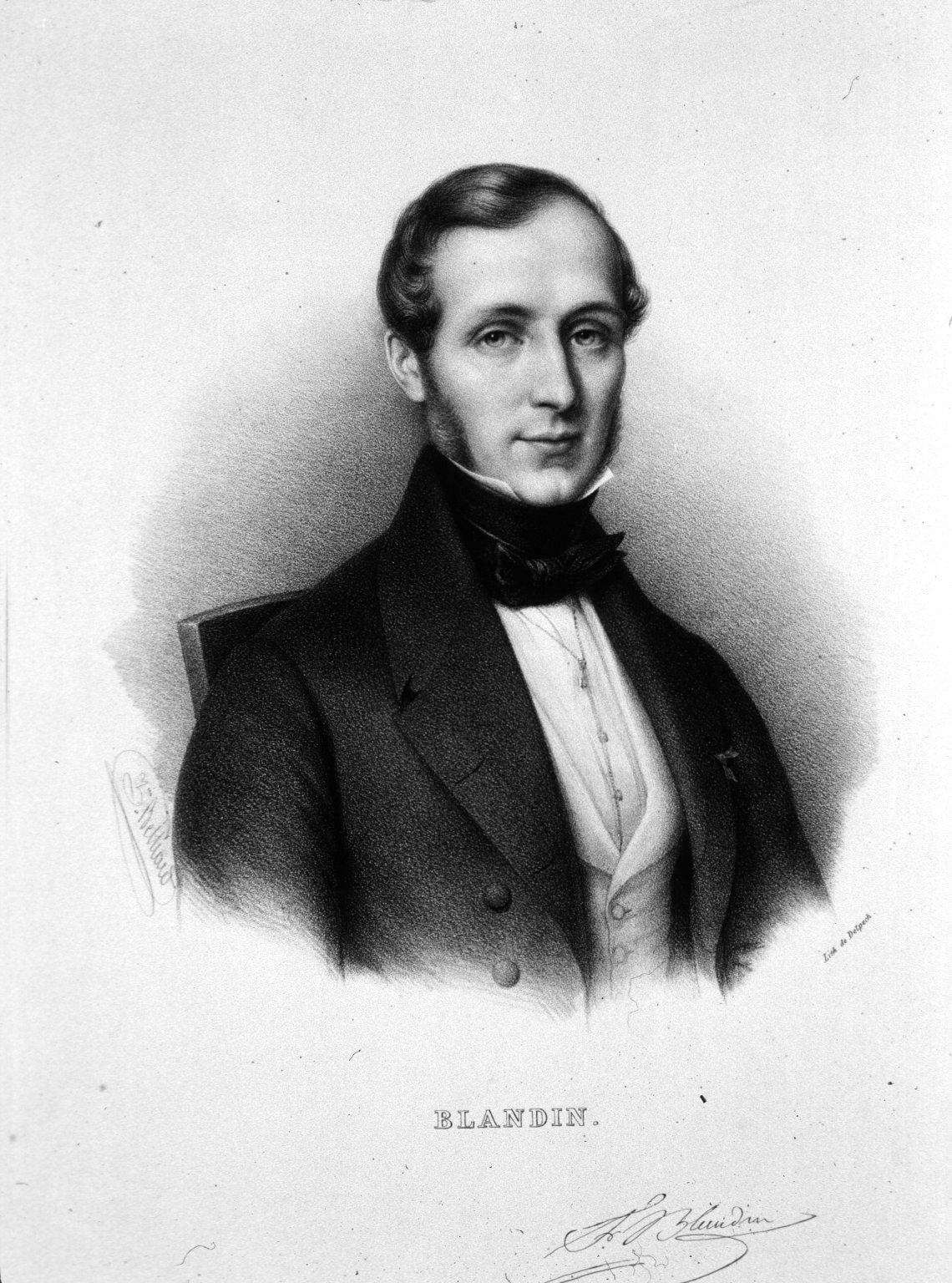
Philippe-Frédéric Blandin

Philippe-Frédéric Blandin (2 December 1798 – 16 April 1849) was a French surgeon born in Aubigny, department of Cher.

From 1821 he served as an anatomical assistant to the faculty of medicine in Paris, where he later worked as prosector (1824). In March 1826 he earned his aggregation in surgery with a dissertation titled "Diversae in abdomen liquidorum effusiones". From 1841 to 1849 he was a professor to the faculty of medicine (chair of opérations et appareils).

Blandin is remembered today for his pioneer work in rhinoplasty and septoplasty. He is credited with coining the term autoplastie (autoplasty) to describe skin taken from same patient for grafting purposes.

He provided an early description of the anterior lingual glands, which are mixed glands of the tongue that are sometimes referred to as "Blandin's glands". His best written effort is an atlas of anatomy and surgery called "Traité d'anatomie topographique" (1834).

He was a member of the Académie Nationale de Médecine (surgical pathology section) and the Société anatomique de Paris (vice-president 1827–28).

== Selected writings ==
- Traité d'anatomie topographique, ou Anatomie des régions du corps humain considérée spécialement dans ses rapports avec la chirurgie et la médecine opératoire, 1834.
- Anatomie du système dentaire considérée dans l'homme et les animaux, 1836.
- Autoplastie, ou Restauration des parties du corps qui ont été détruites, à la faveur d'un emprunt fait à d'autres parties plus ou moins éloignées, 1836.
- De l'Usage des inhalations d'éther dans les opérations chirurgicales, 1847.

== Bibliography ==
- France savante (biography)
- Antiquariaat Forum, Rare Books
