= Blanding =

Blanding can refer to:

== People ==
- Don Blanding (1894–1957), American poet
- Sarah Gibson Blanding (1898–1985), American educator and academic administrator
- Quin Blanding (born 1996), American football player

== Places ==
- Blanding, Utah, United States
- Camp Blanding, Military reservation and training base in Florida

== See also ==
- Blandings Castle, fictional location of P. G. Wodehouse stories
