= Hyoglossus =

Muscle of the tongue

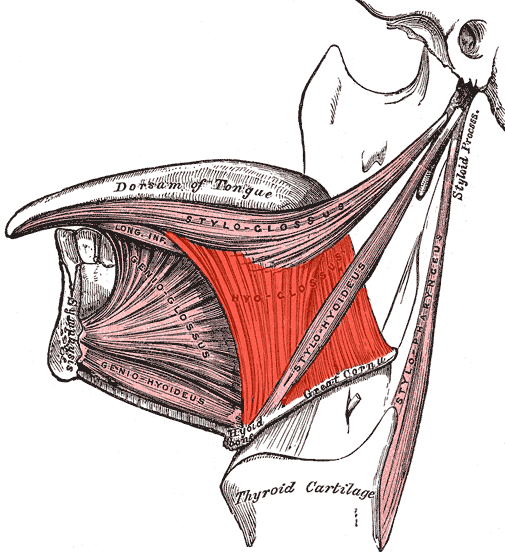
- Extrinsic muscles of the tongue. Left side. (Hyoglossus visible at center.)

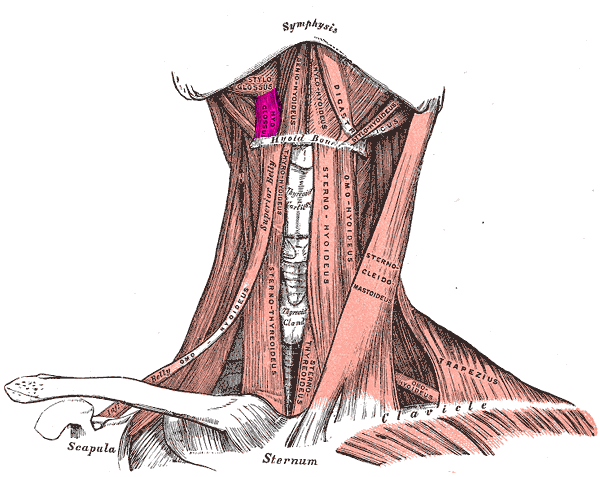
- Muscles of the neck. Anterior view. Hyoglossal muscle in purple

Details
- Origin: Hyoid
- Insertion: Side of the tongue
- Nerve: Hypoglossal (CN XII)
- Actions: Depresses and retracts the tongue

Identifiers
- Latin: musculus hyoglossus
- TA98: A05.1.04.102
- TA2: 2118
- FMA: 46691

The hyoglossus is a thin and quadrilateral extrinsic muscle of the tongue. It originates from the hyoid bone; it inserts onto the side of the tongue. It is innervated by the hypoglossal nerve (cranial nerve XII). It acts to depress and retract the tongue.

== Structure ==
It forms a part of the floor of submandibular triangle.

=== Origin ===
from the side of the body and from the whole length of the greater cornu of the hyoid bone. The fibers arising from the body of the hyoid bone overlap those from the greater cornu.

=== Insertion ===
Its fibres pass almost vertically upward to enter the side of the tongue, inserting between the styloglossus and the inferior longitudinal muscle of the tongue.

=== Relations ===
Structures that are medial/deep to the hyoglossus are the glossopharyngeal nerve (CN IX), the stylohyoid ligament and the lingual artery and lingual vein.

The lingual vein passes medial to the hyoglossus. The lingual artery passes deep to the hyoglossus.

Laterally, in between the hyoglossus muscle and the mylohyoid muscle, lay several important structures (from upper to lower): sublingual gland, submandibular duct, lingual nerve, vena comitans of hypoglossal nerve, and the hypoglossal nerve. Note, posteriorly, the lingual nerve is superior to the submandibular duct and a portion of the submandibular salivary gland protrudes into the space between the hyoglossus and mylohyoid muscles.

== Function ==
The hyoglossus depresses and retracts the tongue and makes the dorsum more convex.

== Additional images ==
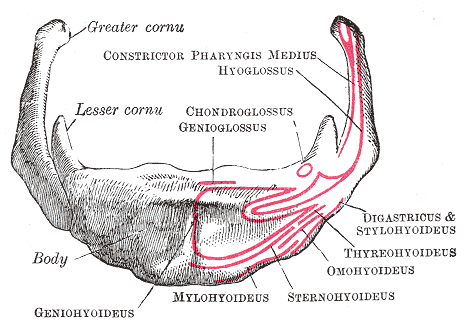
Hyoid bone. Anterior surface. Enlarged.

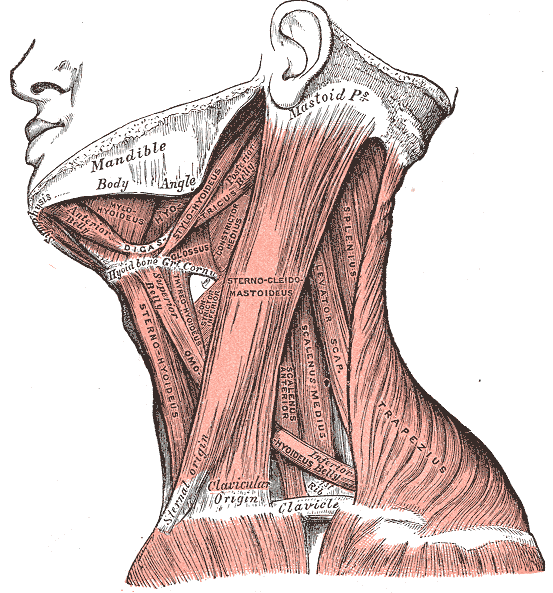
Muscles of the neck. Lateral view.

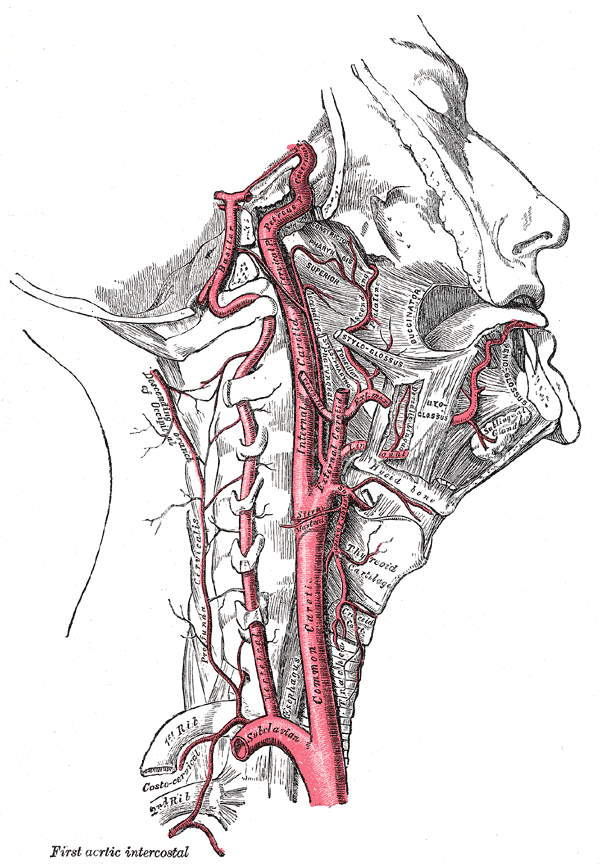
The internal carotid and vertebral arteries. Right side.

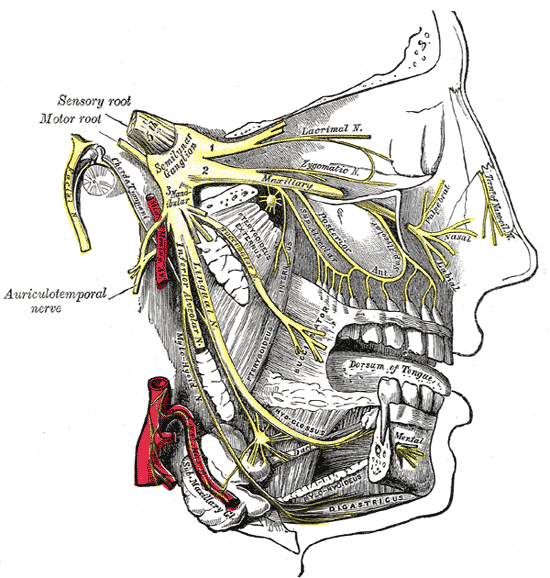
Distribution of the maxillary and mandibular nerves, and the submaxillary ganglion.

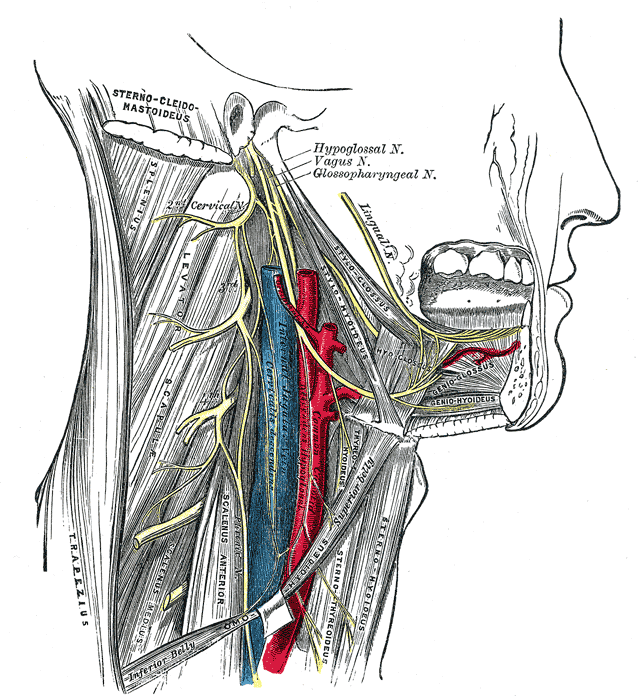
Hypoglossal nerve, cervical plexus, and their branches.

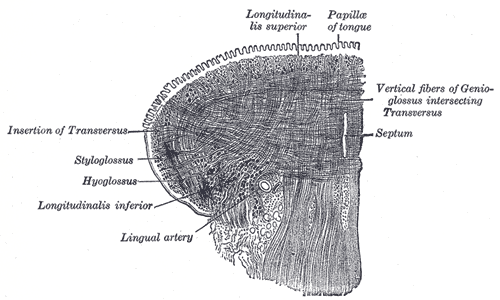
Coronal section of tongue, showing intrinsic muscles.

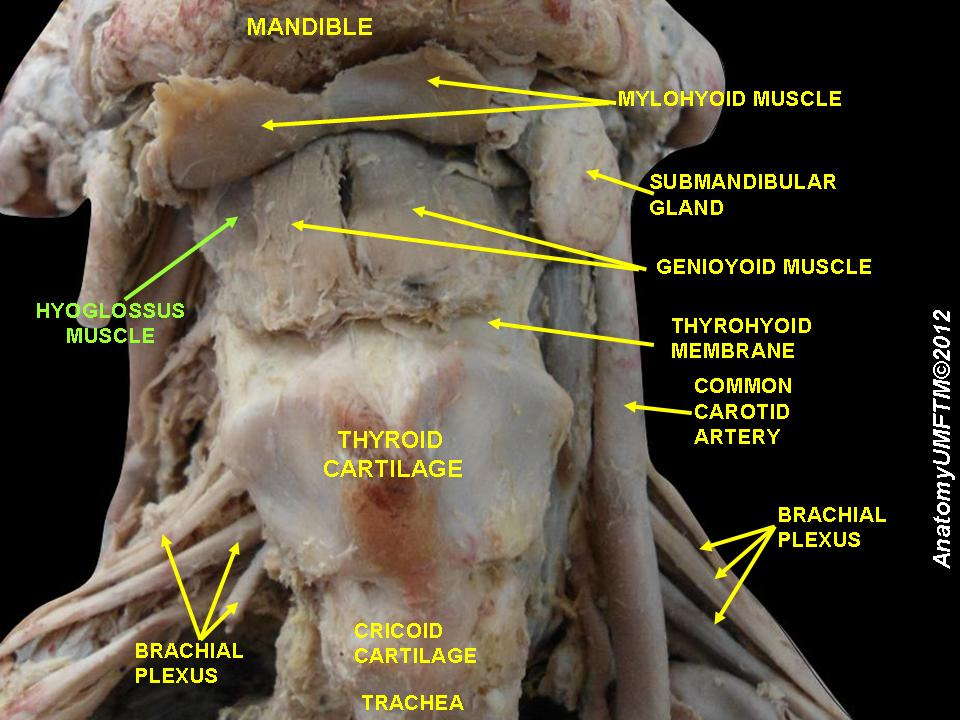
Hyoglossus muscle
