= Inferior longitudinal muscle of tongue =

Intrinsic muscle of the tongue

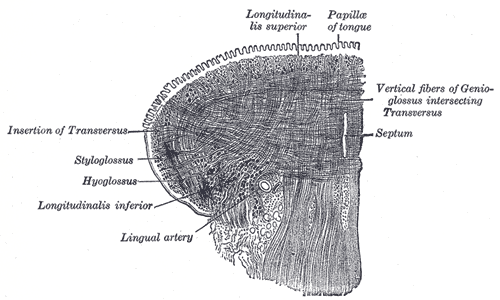
- Coronal section of tongue, showing intrinsic muscles.

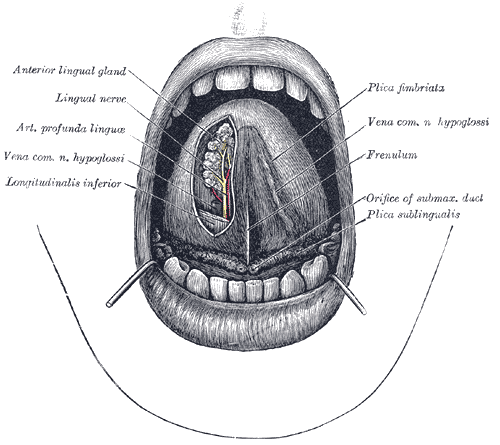
- The mouth cavity. (Longitudinalis inferior labeled at bottom left.)

Details
- Origin: Root of tongue
- Insertion: Apex of tongue
- Nerve: Hypoglossal nerve (CN XII)
- Actions: Retracts tongue with superior longitudinal muscle, making tongue short and thick

Identifiers
- Latin: musculus longitudinalis inferior linguae
- TA98: A05.1.04.107
- TA2: 2123
- FMA: 46694

The inferior longitudinal muscle of tongue is an intrinsic muscle of the tongue. It is situated on the under surface of the tongue between the genioglossus and hyoglossus. It is innervated by the hypoglossal nerve (cranial nerve XII). Its contraction shortens and thickens the tongue.

== Structure ==
The inferior longitudinal muscle of the tongue is an intrinsic muscle of the tongue. It is thin and oval in cross-section. It is situated between the paramedian septum, and the lateral septum. It extends from the root to the apex of the tongue. Posteriorly, some of its fibers attach onto the body of the hyoid bone. Anteriorly, its fibres blend with those of the styloglossus, hyoglossus, and genioglossus to form the ventral area of the tip of the tongue.

=== Innervation ===
The inferior longitudinal muscle of the tongue is supplied by the hypoglossal nerve (CN XII).

== Function ==
Contraciton of the inferior longitudinal muscle of the tongue shortens and thickens the tongue.

== Additional images ==
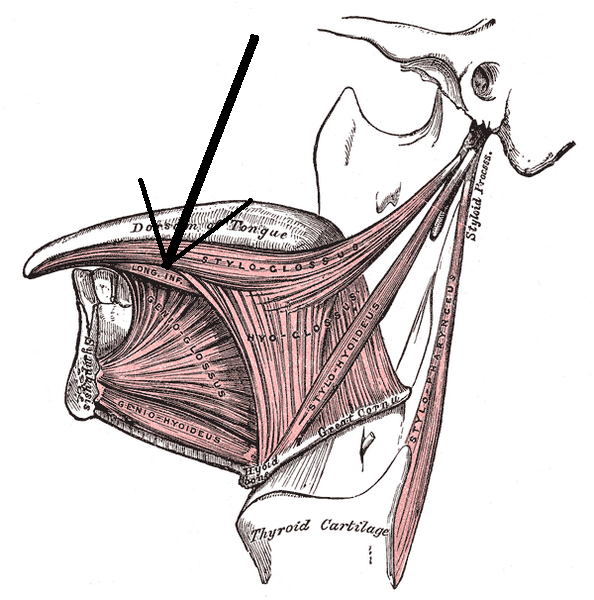
