= Styloglossus =

Tongue muscle

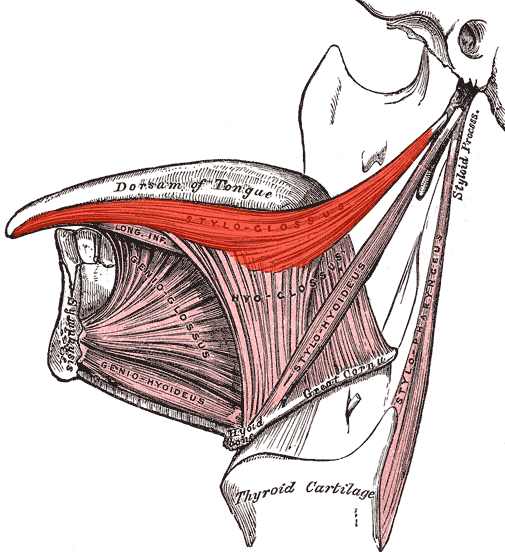
- Extrinsic muscles of the tongue. Left side. (Styloglossus XII visible at center top.)

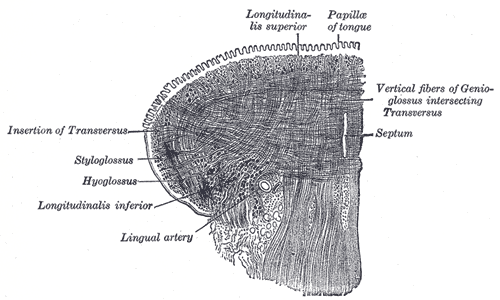
- Coronal section of tongue, showing intrinsic muscles. (Styloglossus labeled at center left.)

Details
- Origin: Styloid process of temporal bone
- Insertion: Tip and sides of tongue
- Artery: Sublingual branch of the lingual artery
- Nerve: Hypoglossal nerve (CN XII)
- Actions: Retraction and elevation of tongue

Identifiers
- Latin: musculus styloglossus
- TA98: A05.1.04.105
- TA2: 2121
- FMA: 46692

The styloglossus muscle is a bilaterally paired muscle of the tongue. It originates at the styloid process of the temporal bone. It inserts onto the side of the tongue. It acts to elevate and retract the tongue. It is innervated by the hypoglossal nerve (cranial nerve XII).

== Anatomy ==
The styloglossus muscle is the shortest and smallest of the three styloid muscles.

=== Origin ===
It arises from (the anterior and lateral surfaces of) the styloid process of the temporal bone near its apex, and from the stylomandibular ligament.

=== Course and relations ===
It passes anterioinferiorly from its origin to its insertion between the internal carotid artery and the external carotid artery, and between the superior pharyngeal constrictor muscle and the middle pharyngeal constrictor muscle.

=== Insertion ===
It divides upon the side of the tongue near the dorsal surface of the tongue, blending with the fibers of the longitudinalis inferior muscle anterior to the hyoglossus muscle.

=== Innervation ===
The styloglossus is innervated by the hypoglossal nerve (CN XII) (like all muscles of the tongue except palatoglossus which is innervated by the pharyngeal plexus of vagus nerve (CN X)).

== Function ==
The styloglossus draws up the sides of the tongue to create a trough for swallowing. Acting bilaterally (both styloglossus muscles contracting simultaneously) they also aid in retracting the tongue.

== Additional images ==
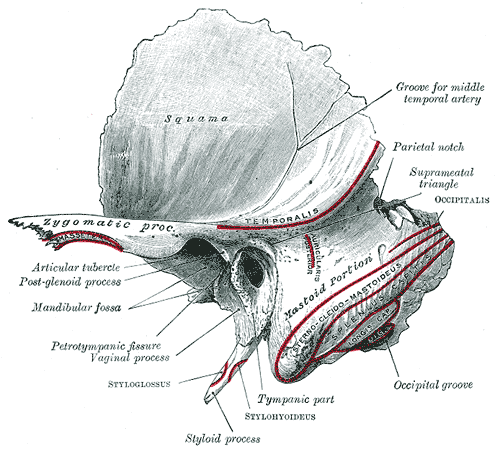
Left temporal bone. Outer surface.

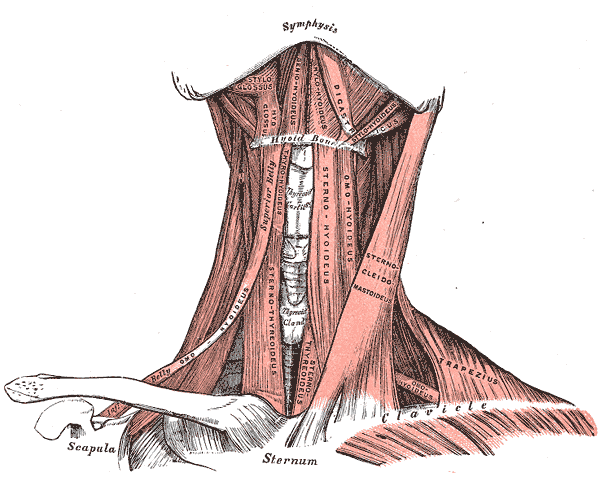
Muscles of the neck. Anterior view.

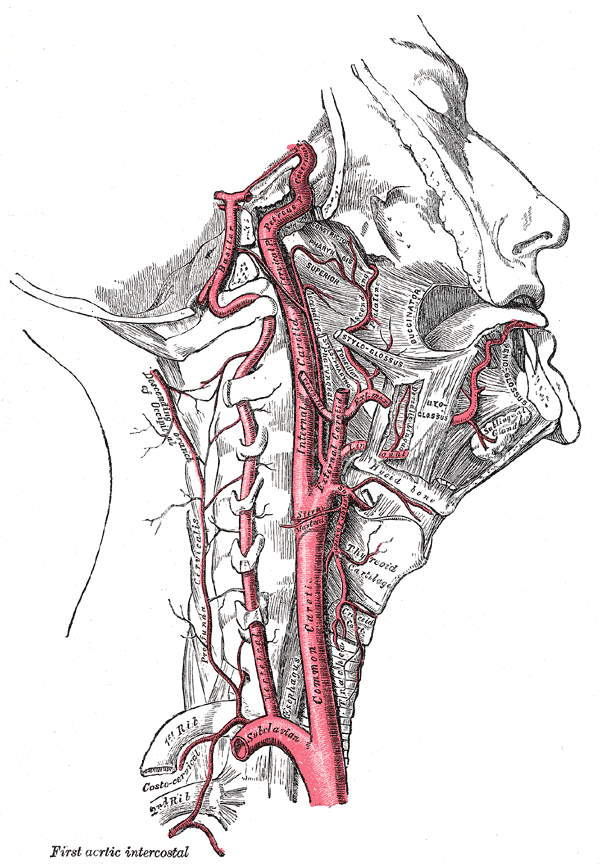
The internal carotid and vertebral arteries. Right side.

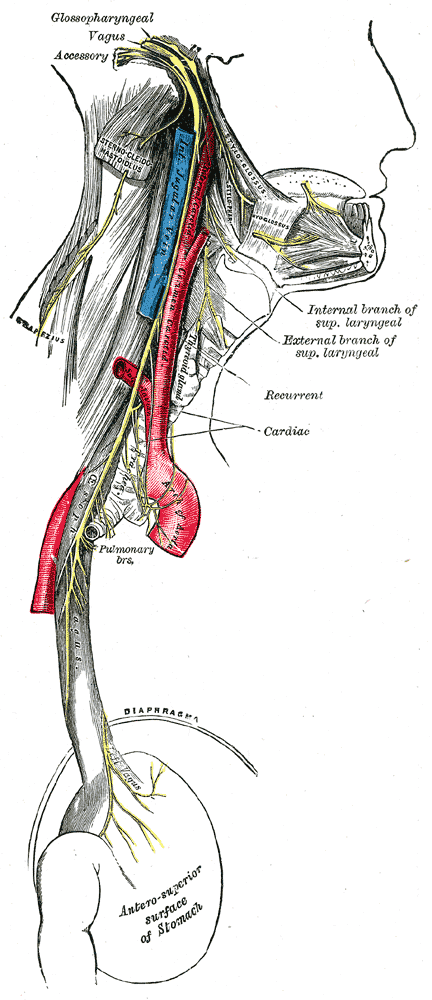
Course and distribution of the glossopharyngeal, vagus, and accessory nerves.

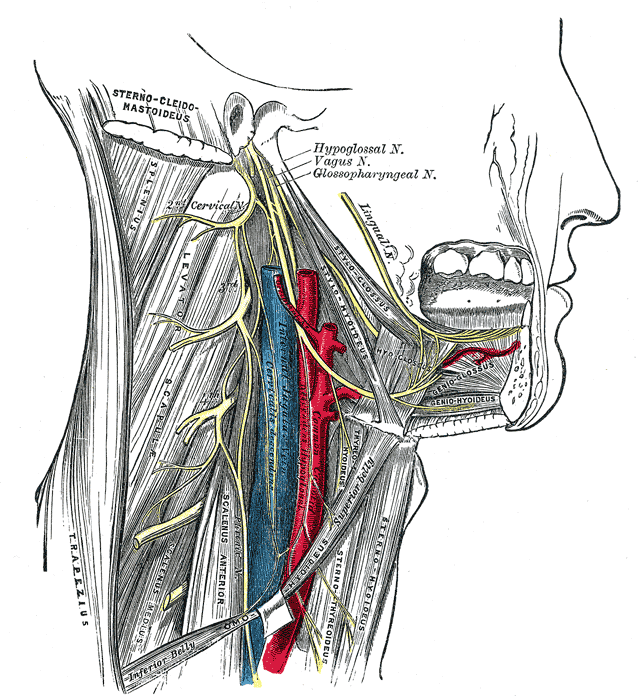
Hypoglossal nerve, cervical plexus, and their branches.

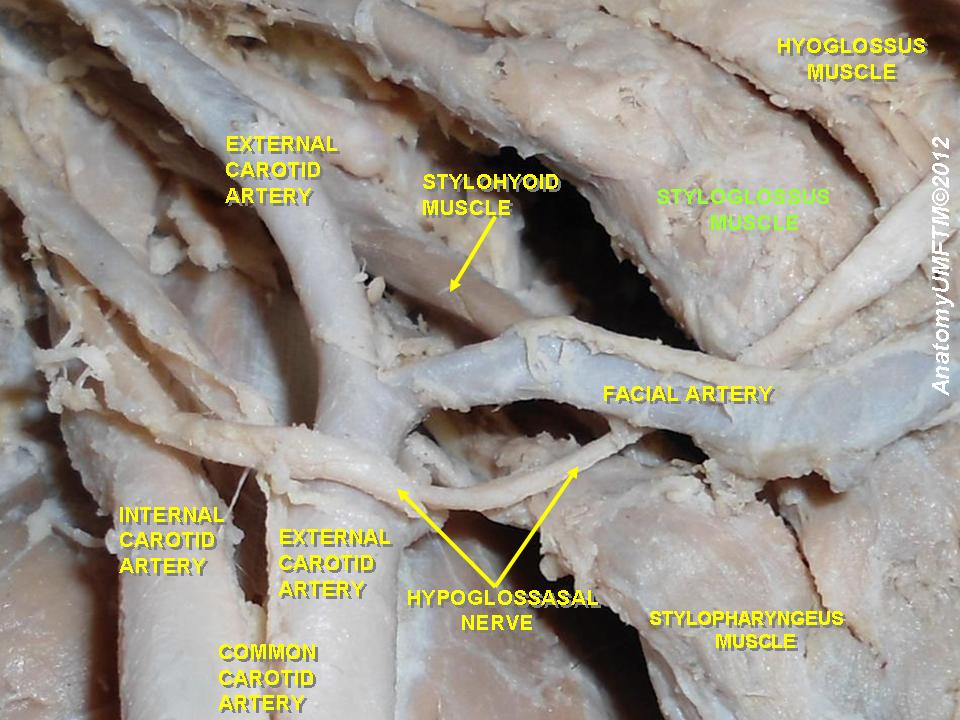
Styloglossus muscle

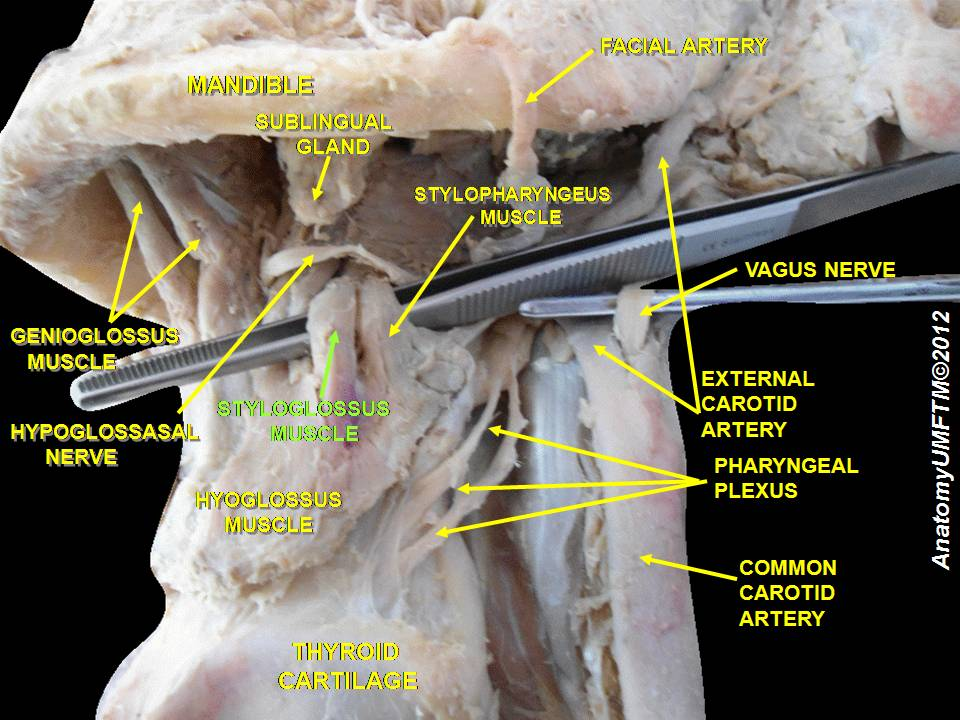
Styloglossus muscle

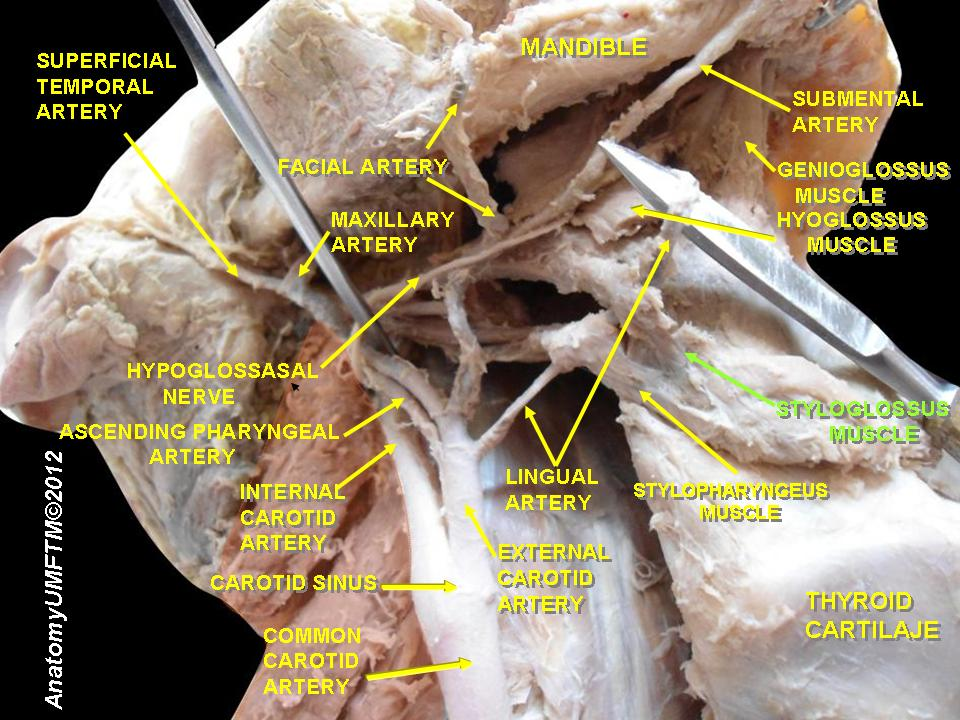
Styloglossus muscle

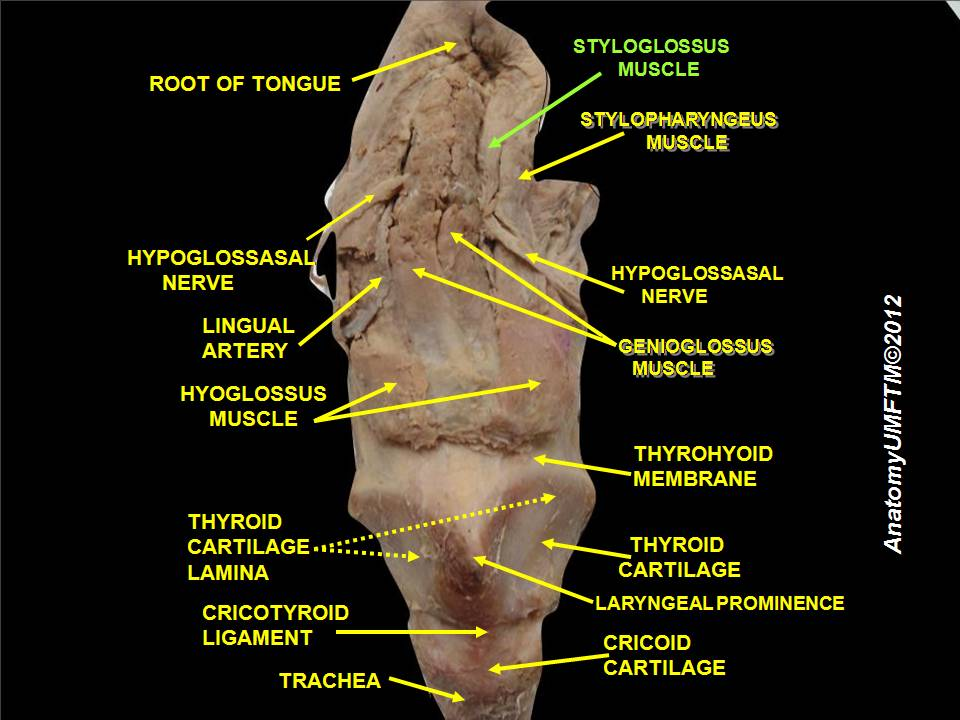
Styloglossus muscle
