= María Teresa Blandón =

Nicaraguan sociologist, feminist, and former revolutionary guerilla

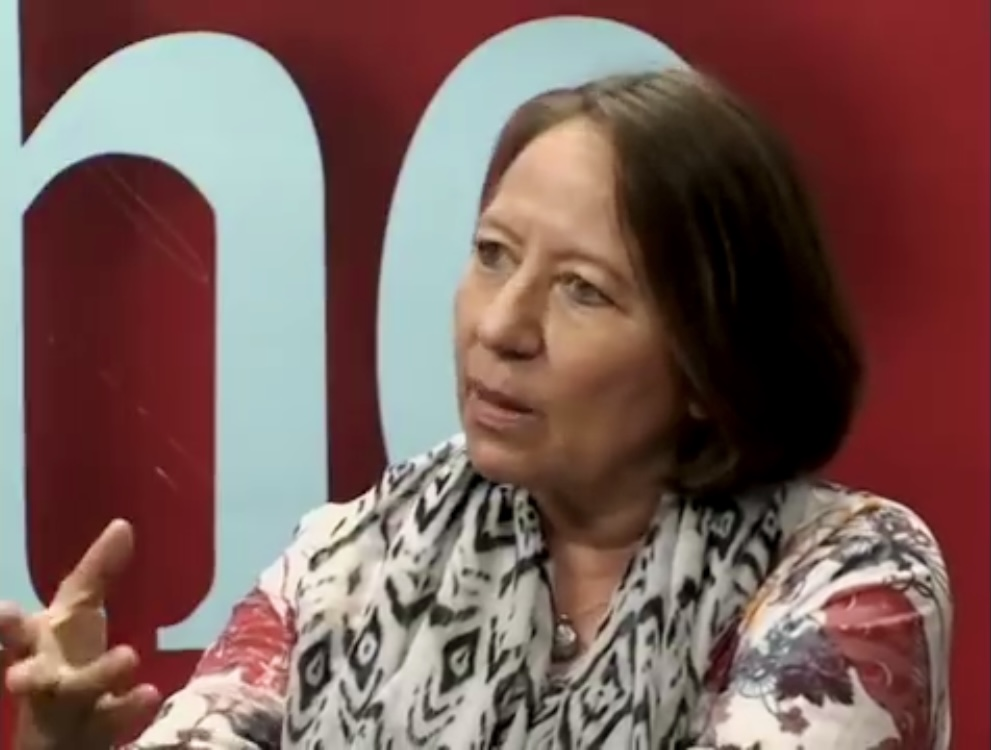
- Blandón in a 2018 interview
- Born: María Teresa Blandón Gadea; 1961 (age 64–65); Matiguás
- Occupation: Feminist
- Known for: La Corriente

María Teresa Blandón Gadea (born 1961) is a Nicaraguan sociologist, feminist, and former revolutionary guerilla.

Blandón was born in Matiguás, a town in northern Nicaragua and from a young age began working with peasants there. At 17, she became involved in the Nicaraguan Revolution, fighting as a revolutionary guerilla on the ground. During and immediately after the war she established a feminist identity and became determined to advance women's rights. After the war, Blandón worked in an agricultural trade union, giving lectures on sexuality, gender, and violence against women. She began to dedicate herself to the furthering of women's reproductive rights. Cooperating with other Central American feminists, Blandón founded the feminist program La Corriente, an organization aimed at promoting feminist thought that continues to operate today.

She has a Master's degree in Gender and Development Perspective from the University of Barcelona, is a Postgraduate in Education in Gender Focus at the Central American University of Managua, and is a consultant in gender policy and development.

On May 4, 2022, the legal status of the Regional Feminist Program La Corriente, headed by Blandón, was annulled and its facilities were confiscated, arguing an alleged breach of the laws in force by the Ortega regime. In September 2022, she was denied entry to Nicaragua, in retaliation for her feminist activism.
