= Jugular vein =

Veins that bring deoxygenated blood from the head back to the heart

Jugular veins
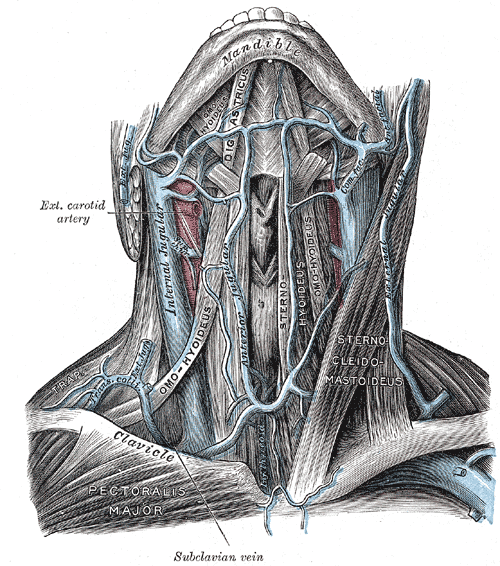
- View of the veins of the neck.

Details
- System: Circulatory system
- Drains from: Head
- Drains to: Brachiocephalic vein (internal), subclavian vein (external)
- Artery: Common carotid artery (internal)

Identifiers
- Latin: Venae iugulares
- MeSH: D007601

The jugular veins (Latin: Venae iugulares) are veins that take blood from the head back to the heart via the superior vena cava. The internal jugular vein descends next to the internal carotid artery and continues posteriorly to the sternocleidomastoid muscle.

== Structure and function ==
There are two sets of jugular veins: external and internal.

The left and right external jugular veins drain into the subclavian veins. The internal jugular veins join with the subclavian veins more medially to form the brachiocephalic veins. Finally, the left and right brachiocephalic veins join to form the superior vena cava, which delivers deoxygenated blood to the right atrium of the heart. The jugular vein has tributaries consisting of petrosal sinus, facial, lingual, pharylingual, the thyroid, and sometimes the occipital vein.

=== Internal ===
The internal jugular vein is formed by the anastomosis of blood from the sigmoid sinus of the dura mater and the inferior petrosal sinus. The internal jugular runs with the common carotid artery and vagus nerve inside the carotid sheath. It provides venous drainage for the contents of the skull.

=== External ===
The external jugular vein runs superficially to sternocleidomastoid.

There is also another minor jugular vein, the anterior jugular vein, draining the submaxillary region.

== Clinical significance ==
=== Pressure ===
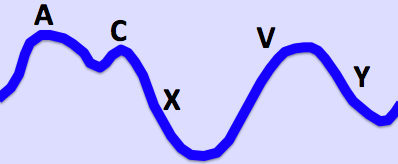
The Jugular Venous Pressure Waveform

The jugular venous pressure is an indirectly observed pressure over the venous system. It can be useful in the differentiation of different forms of heart and lung disease.

In the jugular veins pressure waveform, upward deflections correspond with (A) atrial contraction, (C) ventricular contraction (and resulting bulging of tricuspid valve into the right atrium during isovolumic systole), and (V) atrial venous filling. The downward deflections correspond with (X) the atrium relaxing (and the tricuspid valve moving downward) and (y) the filling of ventricle (after the tricuspid opens).

Components include:

- The a peak is caused by the contraction of the right atrium.
- The av minimum is due to relaxation of the right atrium and closure of the tricuspid valve.
- The c peak reflects the pressure rise in the right ventricle early during systole and the resultant bulging of the tricuspid valve—which has just closed—into the right atrium.
- The x minimum occurs as the ventricle contracts and shortens during the ejection phase, later in systole. The shortening heart—with tricuspid valve still closed—pulls on valve opens, the v peak begins to wane.
- The y minimum reflects a fall in right atrial pressure during rapid ventricular filling, as blood leaves the right atrium through an open tricuspid valve and enters the right ventricle. The increase in venous pressure after the y minimum occurs as venous return continues in the face of reduced ventricular filling.

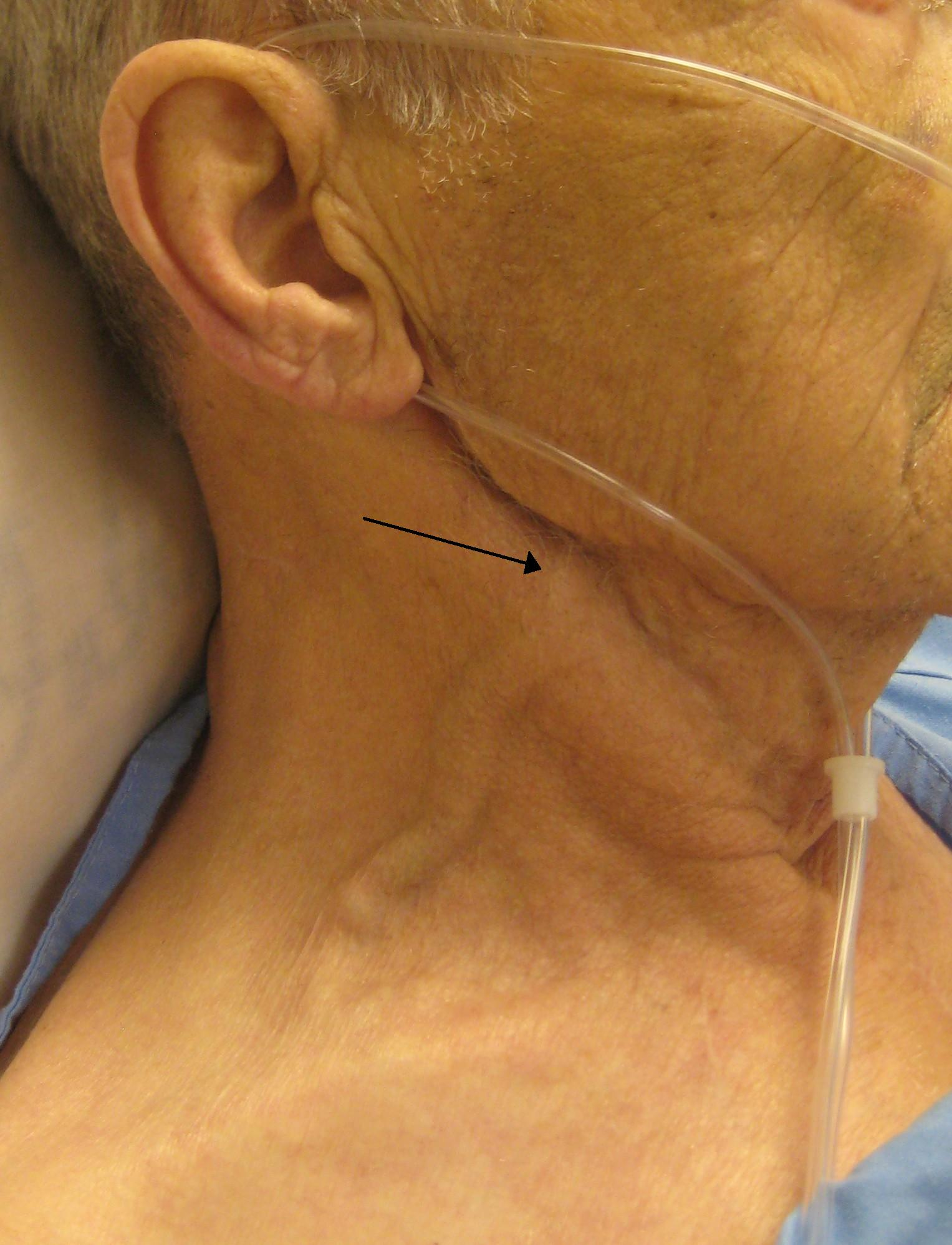
A patient with congestive heart failure that has an elevated (or bulging) jugular vein.

=== Diseases and conditions ===
The jugular vein is prominent in heart failure. When the patient is sitting or in a semirecumbent position, the height of the jugular veins and their pulsations provides an estimate of the central venous pressure and gives important information about whether the heart is keeping up with the demands on it or is failing. Distension of the jugular is a potential sign of heart failure, cardiac tamponade, or coronary artery disease.

Examination of the neck veins is routinely performed to evaluate atrial pressure and to estimate intravascular volume in patients with dyspnea, edema, or hypovolemia. Elevated venous pressure may indicate left or right ventricular failure or heart disease.

Symptoms associated with abnormal flow or pressure in the jugular veins include hearing loss, dizziness, blurry vision, swollen eyes, neck pain, headaches, and sleeping difficulty.

== Idiomatic expression ==
The jugular vein is the subject of an idiom in the English language: "to go for the jugular" means to attack decisively at the weakest point. However, this phrase is anatomically inaccurate, as the jugular is not the most critical or vulnerable point in the cardiovascular system. The jugular vein runs parallel to the carotid artery and operates under much lower pressure, returning deoxygenated blood to the heart, whereas the carotid artery, a high-pressure vessel supplying oxygenated blood to the brain, is far more critical and vulnerable in sustaining cerebral circulation.

== See also ==
- Chronic cerebrospinal venous insufficiency
