= Pharyngeal veins =

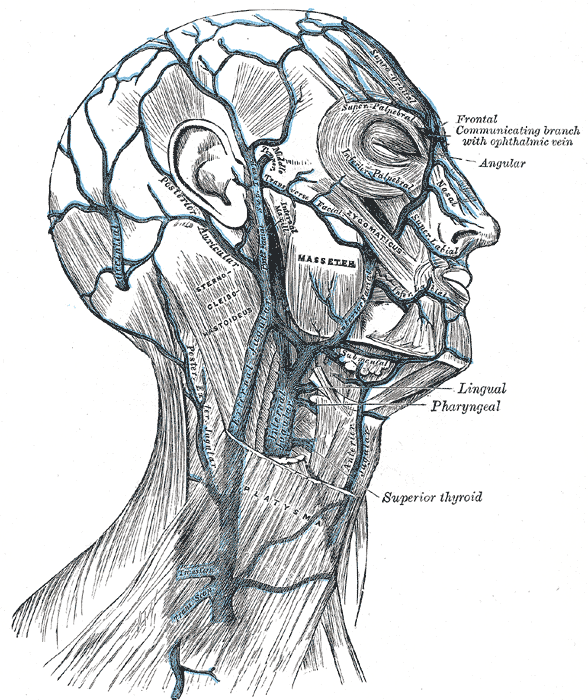
- Veins of the head and neck. (Pharyngeal visible at left.)

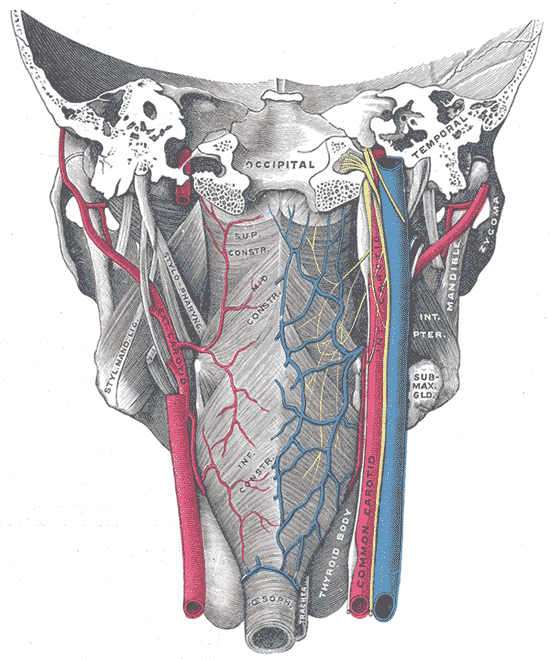
- Muscles of the pharynx, viewed from behind, together with the associated vessels and nerves.

Details
- Drains from: pharynx
- Drains to: internal jugular vein
- Artery: pharyngeal branches of inferior thyroid artery

Identifiers
- Latin: venae pharyngeae
- TA98: A12.3.05.007
- TA2: 4806
- FMA: 70840

The pharyngeal veins commence in the pharyngeal plexus superficial to the pharynx. The pharyngeal veins receive as tributaries meningeal vein, and the vein of the pterygoid canal. The pharyngeal veins typically empty into the internal jugular vein (but may occasionally instead empty into the facial vein, lingual vein, or superior thyroid vein).
