= Common carotid artery =

One of the two arteries that supply the head and neck with blood

- The common carotid artery arises directly from the aorta on the left and as a branch of the brachiocephalic trunk on the right.

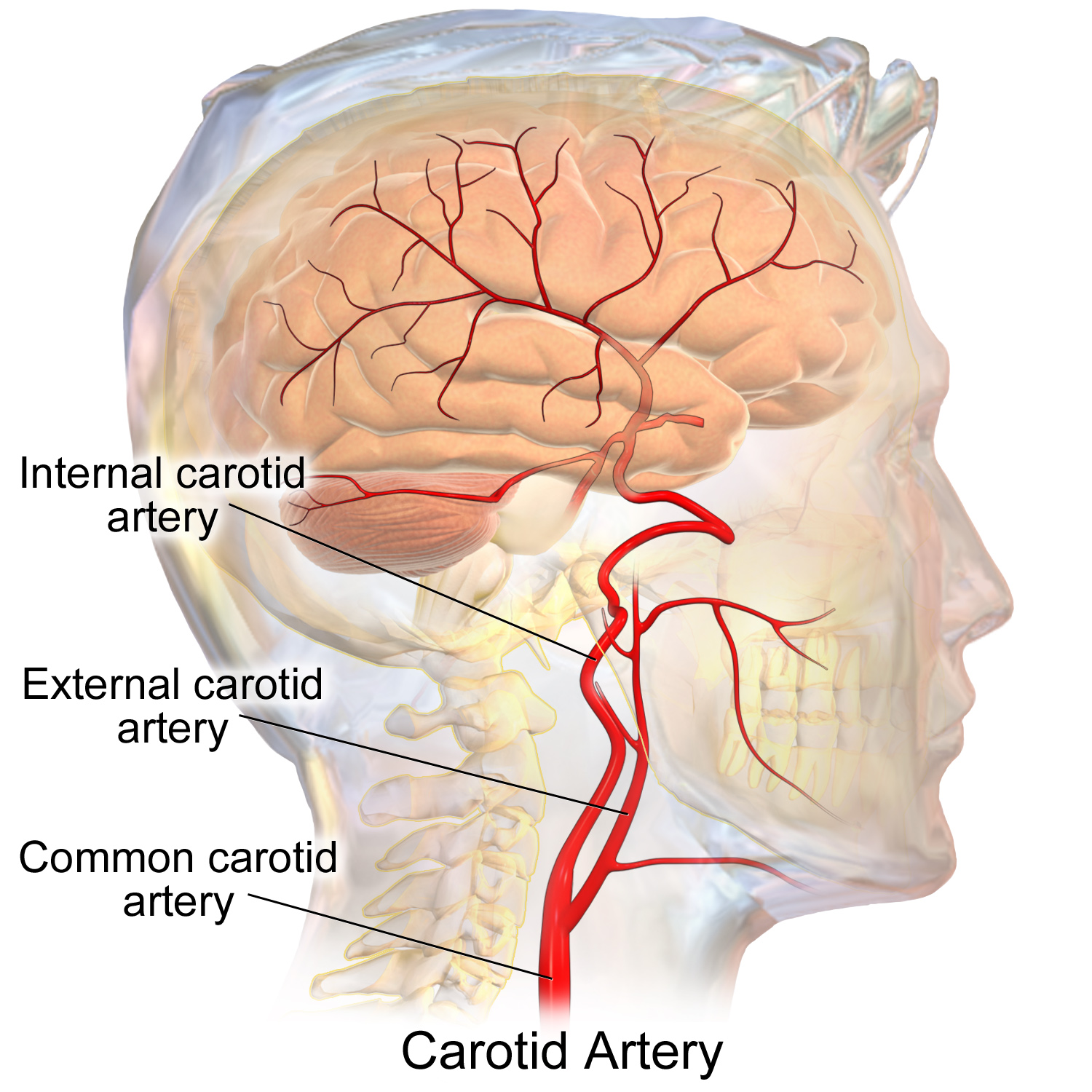
- The common carotid artery and its main branches

Details
- Precursor: Aortic arch 3
- Source: Aortic arch, brachiocephalic artery
- Branches: Internal carotid artery, external carotid artery
- Vein: Internal jugular vein
- Supplies: Head and neck

Identifiers
- Latin: arteria carotis communis
- MeSH: D017536
- TA98: A12.2.04.006
- TA2: 4366
- FMA: 3939

In anatomy, the left and right common carotid arteries (carotids) (English: /kəˈrɒtɪd/) are arteries that supply the head and neck with oxygenated blood; they divide in the neck to form the external and internal carotid arteries.

== Structure ==
The common carotid arteries are present on the left and right sides of the body. These arteries originate from different arteries but follow symmetrical courses. The right common carotid originates in the neck from the brachiocephalic trunk; the left from the aortic arch in the thorax. These split into the external and internal carotid arteries at the upper border of the thyroid cartilage, at around the level of the fourth cervical vertebra.

The left common carotid artery can be thought of as having two parts: a thoracic (chest) part and a cervical (neck) part. The right common carotid originates in or close to the neck and contains only a small thoracic portion. There are studies in the bioengineering literature that have looked into characterizing the geometric structure of the common carotid artery from both qualitative and mathematical (quantitative) standpoints.

The average diameters of the common carotids in adult males and females are 6.5 mm and 6.1 mm respectively.

=== In the chest ===
Only the left common carotid artery has a substantial presence in the thorax. It originates directly from the aortic arch, and travels upward through the superior mediastinum to the level of the left sternoclavicular joint.

During the thoracic part of its course, the left common carotid artery is related to the following structures: In front, it is separated from the manubrium of the sternum by the sternohyoid and sternothyroid muscles, the anterior portions of the left pleura and lung, the left brachiocephalic vein, and the remains of the thymus; behind, it lies on the trachea, esophagus, left recurrent laryngeal nerve, and thoracic duct.

To its right side, below is the brachiocephalic trunk, and above, the trachea, the inferior thyroid veins, and the remains of the thymus; to its left side are the left vagus and phrenic nerves, left pleura, and lung. The left subclavian artery is posterior and slightly lateral to it.

=== In the neck ===
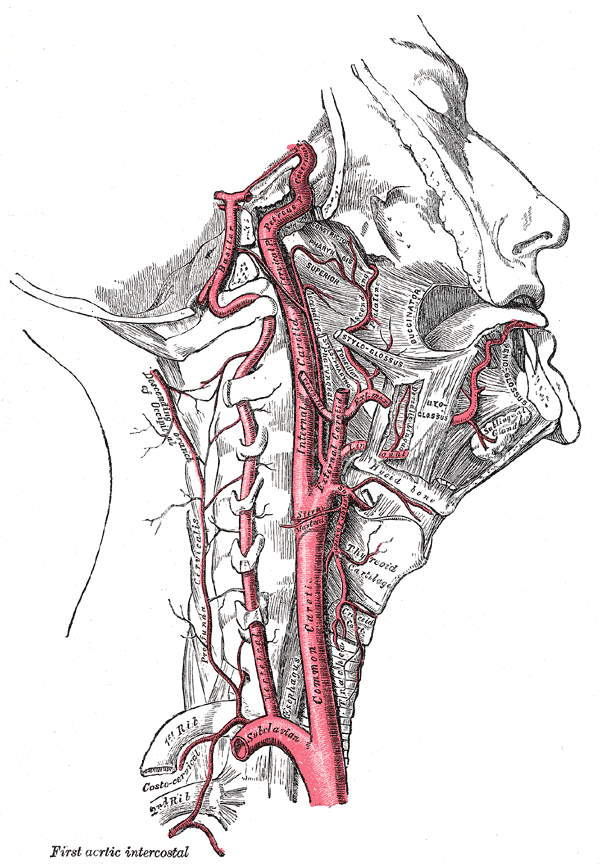
Arteries of the neck. The right common carotid artery – labeled Common caroti in the figure – divides into the right internal carotid artery and external carotid artery.

The cervical portions of the common carotids resemble each other so closely that one description will apply to both.

Each vessel passes obliquely upward, from behind the sternoclavicular joint to the level of the upper border of the thyroid cartilage, where it divides.

At the lower neck, the two common carotid arteries are separated from each other by a very narrow interval which contains the trachea; but at the upper part, the thyroid gland, the larynx and pharynx separate the two arteries.

The common carotid artery is contained in a sheath known as the carotid sheath, which is derived from the deep cervical fascia and encloses also the internal jugular vein and vagus nerve, the vein lying lateral to the artery, and the nerve between the artery and vein, on a plane posterior to both. On opening the sheath, each of these three structures is seen to have a separate fibrous cover.

At approximately the level of the fourth cervical vertebra, the common carotid artery splits ("bifurcates" in literature) into an internal carotid artery (ICA) and an external carotid artery (ECA). While both branches travel upward, the internal carotid takes a deeper (more internal) path, eventually travelling up into the skull to supply the brain. The external carotid artery travels more closely to the surface, and sends off numerous branches that supply the neck and face.

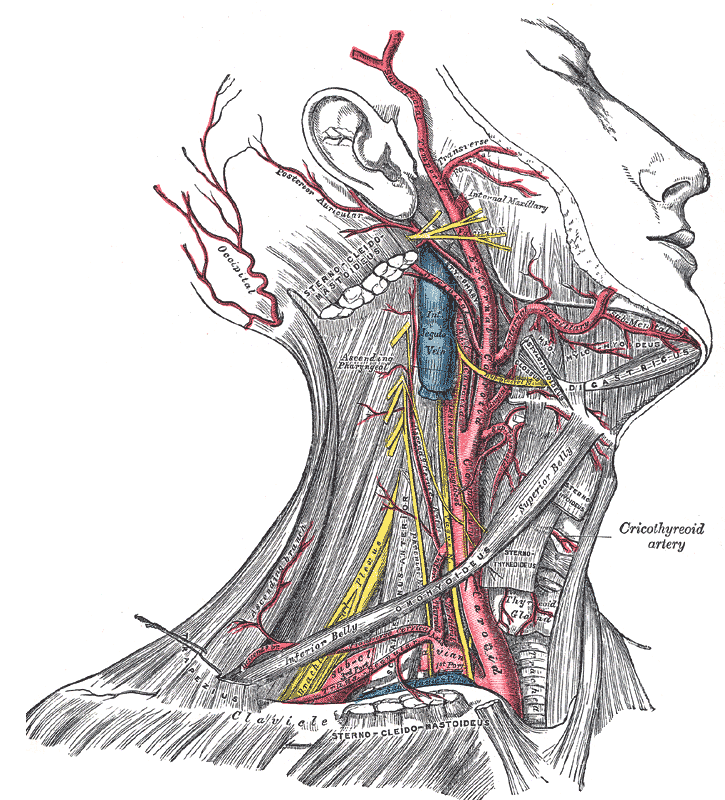
Superficial dissection of the right side of the neck, showing the carotid and subclavian arteries

At the lower part of the neck, the common carotid artery is very deeply seated, being covered by the integument, superficial fascia, the platysma muscle, deep cervical fascia, the sternocleidomastoid muscle, the sternohyoid, sternothyroid, and the omohyoid; in the upper part of its course it is more superficial, being covered merely by the integument, the superficial fascia, the platysma, deep cervical fascia, and medial margin of the sternocleidomastoid.

When the sternocleidomastoid muscle is drawn backward, the artery is seen to be contained in a triangular space known as the carotid triangle. This space is bounded behind by the sternocleidomastoid, above by the stylohyoid and the posterior belly of the digastric muscle, and below by the superior belly of the omohyoid.

This part of the artery is crossed obliquely, from its medial to its lateral side, by the sternocleidomastoid branch of the superior thyroid artery; it is also crossed by the superior and middle thyroid veins (which end in the internal jugular vein); descending in front of its sheath is the descending branch of the hypoglossal nerve, this filament being joined by one or two branches from the cervical nerves, which cross the vessel obliquely.

Sometimes the descending branch of the hypoglossal nerve is contained within the sheath.

The superior thyroid vein crosses the artery near its termination, and the middle thyroid vein a little below the level of the cricoid cartilage; the anterior jugular vein crosses the artery just above the clavicle, but is separated from it by the sternohyoid and sternothyroid.

Behind, the artery is separated from the transverse processes of the cervical vertebrae by the longus colli and longus capitis muscles, the sympathetic trunk being interposed between it and the muscles. The inferior thyroid artery crosses behind the lower part of the vessel.

Medially, it is in relation with the esophagus, trachea, and thyroid gland (which overlaps it), the inferior thyroid artery and recurrent laryngeal nerve being interposed; higher up, with the larynx and pharynx. Lateral to the artery, inside the carotid sheath with the common carotid, are the internal jugular vein and vagus nerve.

At the lower part of the neck, on the right side of the body, the right recurrent laryngeal nerve crosses obliquely behind the artery; the right internal jugular vein diverges from the artery. On the left side, however, the left internal jugular vein approaches and often overlaps the lower part of the artery.

Behind the angle of bifurcation of the common carotid artery is a reddish-brown oval body known as the carotid body. It is similar in structure to the coccygeal body which is situated on the median sacral artery.

The relations of the cervical region of the common carotid artery may be discussed in two points:

- Internal relations of organs present inside the carotid sheath
- two external relations of carotid sheath

== Collateral circulation ==
The chief communications outside the skull take place between the superior and inferior thyroid arteries, and the deep cervical artery and the descending branch of the occipital artery; the vertebral artery takes the place of the internal carotid artery within the cranium.

== Variation ==
=== Origin ===
The right common carotid may rise above the level of the upper border of the sternoclavicular joint; this variation occurs in about 12 percent of cases.

In other cases, the artery on the right side may arise as a separate branch from the arch of the aorta, or in conjunction with the left carotid.

The left common carotid varies in its origin more than the right.

In the majority of abnormal cases it arises with the brachiocephalic trunk; if that artery is absent, the two carotids arise usually by a single trunk.

It is rarely joined with the left subclavian artery, except in cases of transposition of the aortic arch.

=== Point of division ===
In the majority of abnormal cases, the bifurcation occurs higher than usual, the artery dividing opposite or even above the hyoid bone; more rarely, it occurs below, opposite the middle of the larynx, or the lower border of the cricoid cartilage. In at least one reported case, the artery was only 4 cm in length and divided at the root of the neck.

Very rarely, the common carotid artery ascends in the neck without any subdivision, either the external or the internal carotid being absent; and in a few cases the common carotid has itself been found to be absent, the external and internal carotids arising directly from the arch of the aorta.

This peculiarity existed on both sides in some instances, on one side in others.

=== Occasional branches ===
The common carotid usually gives off no branch previous to its bifurcation, but it occasionally gives origin to the superior thyroid artery or its laryngeal branch, the ascending pharyngeal artery, the inferior thyroid artery, or, more rarely, the vertebral artery.

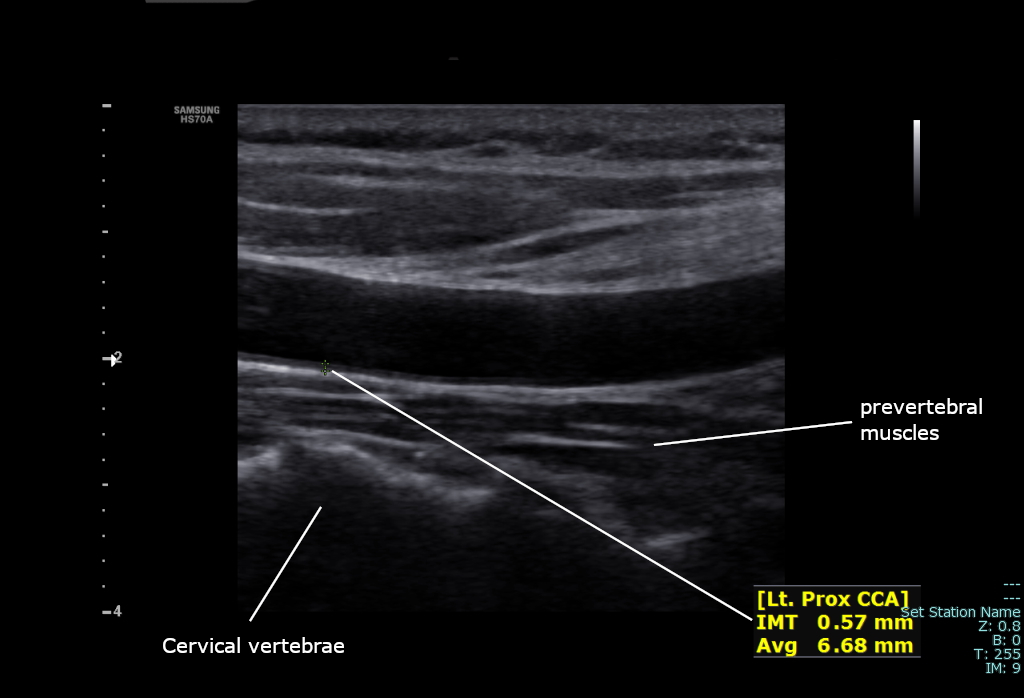
Left proximal common carotid artery intimal thickness (IMT) measurement and diameter by using doppler ultrasound

== Diagnostics ==
The condition and health of the common carotid arteries is usually evaluated using Doppler ultrasound, CT angiography or phase contrast magnetic resonance imaging (PC-MRI).

Typically, blood flow velocities in the common carotid artery are measured as peak systolic velocity (PSV) and end diastolic velocity (EDV).

In a study of normative men aged 20–29 years, the average PSV was 115 cm/sec and EDV was 32 cm/sec. In men 80 years and older, the average PSV was 88 cm/sec and EDV was 17 cm/sec.

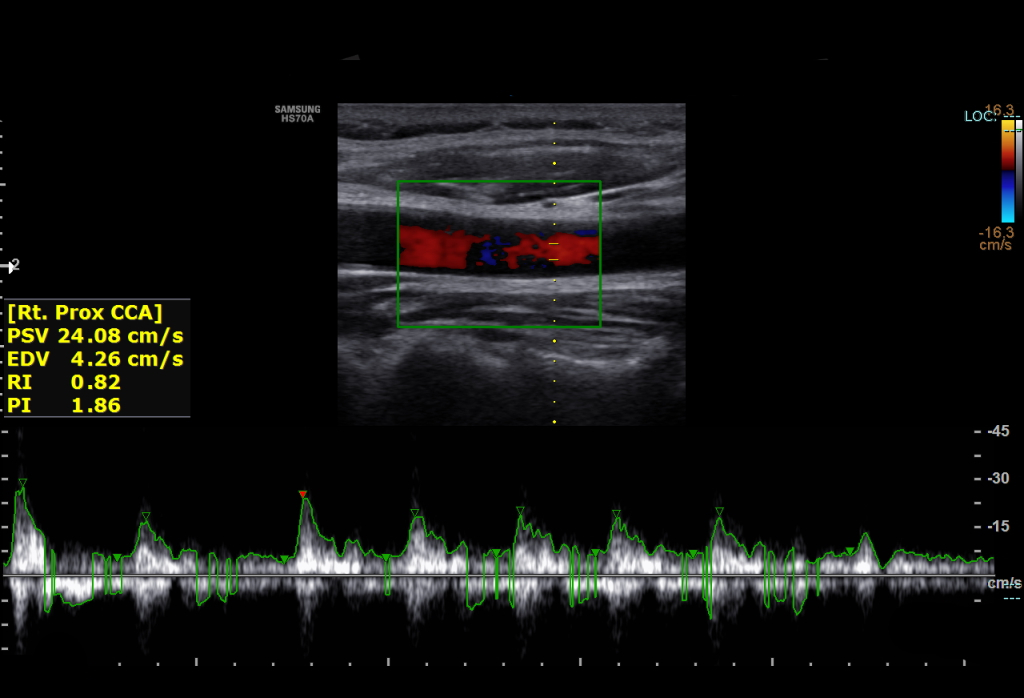
Right proximal common carotid artery normal spectral flow with PSV and EDV measurements by using doppler ultrasound

== Clinical significance ==
The common carotid artery is often used in measuring the pulse, especially in patients who are in shock and who lack a detectable pulse in the more peripheral arteries of the body. The pulse is taken by palpating the artery just deep to the anterior border of the sternocleidomastoid muscle at the level of the superior border of the thyroid cartilage.

Presence of a carotid pulse has been estimated to indicate a systolic blood pressure of more than 40 mmHg, as given by the 50% percentile.

Carotidynia is a syndrome marked by soreness of the carotid artery near the bifurcation.

Carotid stenosis may occur in patients with atherosclerosis.

The intima-media thickness of the carotid artery wall is a marker of subclinical atherosclerosis and it increases with age and with long-term exposure to particulate air pollution.

== Gallery ==
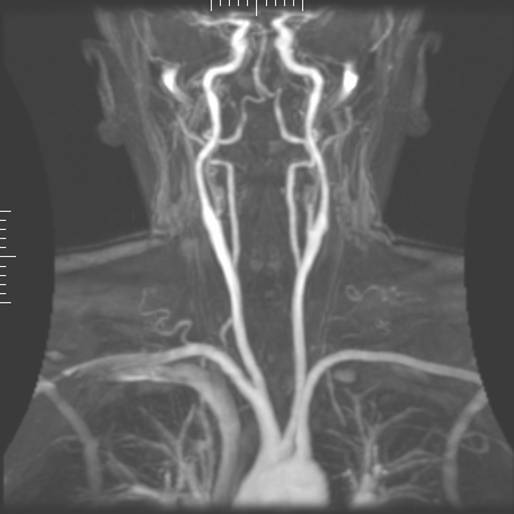
Magnetic Resonance Angiography

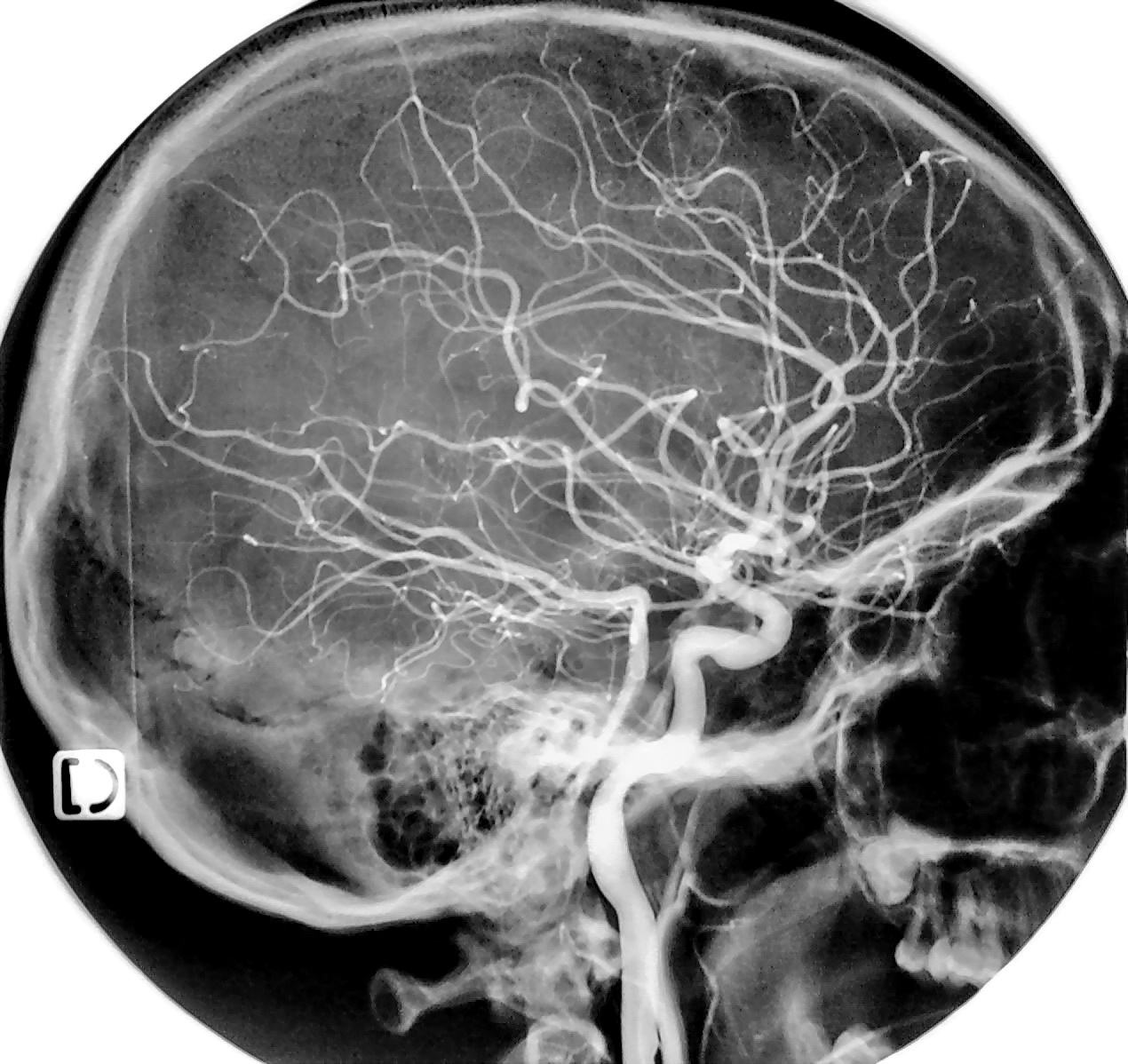
Normal carotidal arteriography

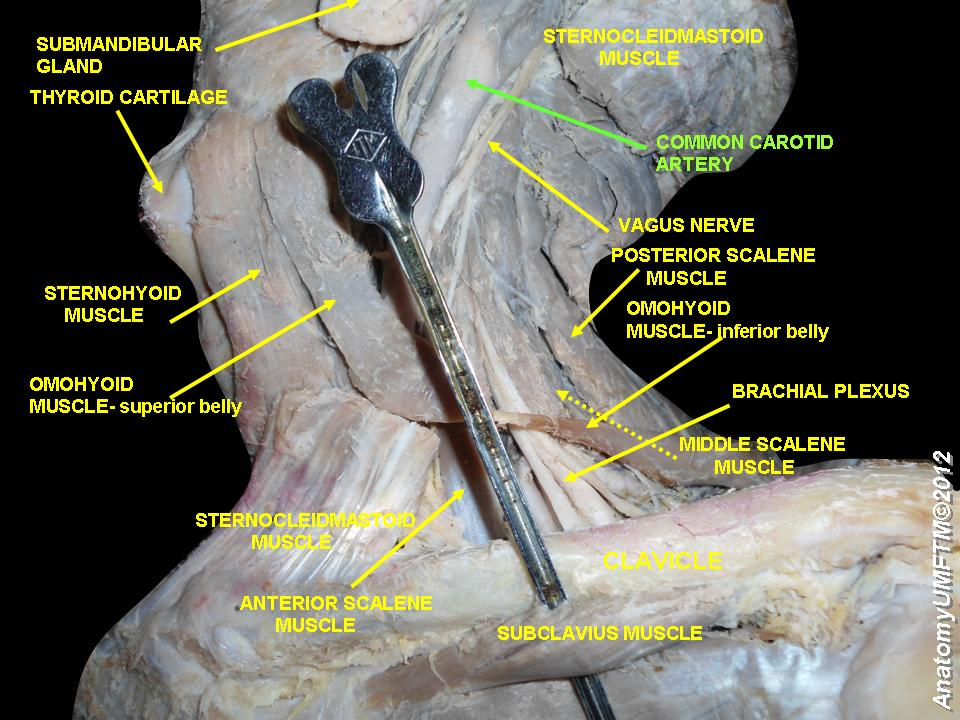
Common carotid artery

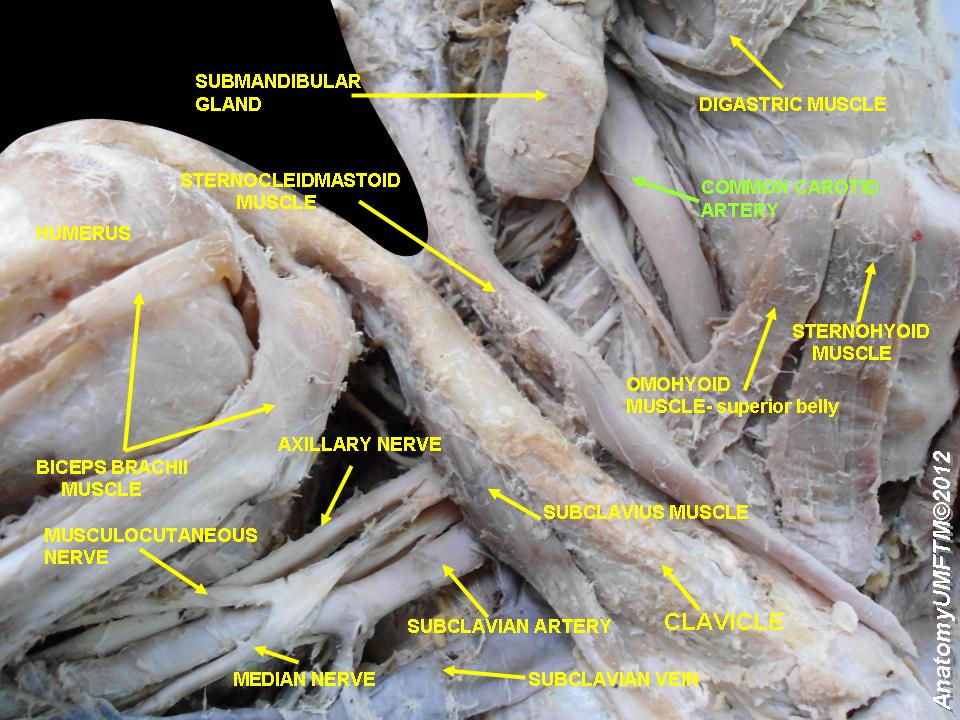
Common carotid artery – right view

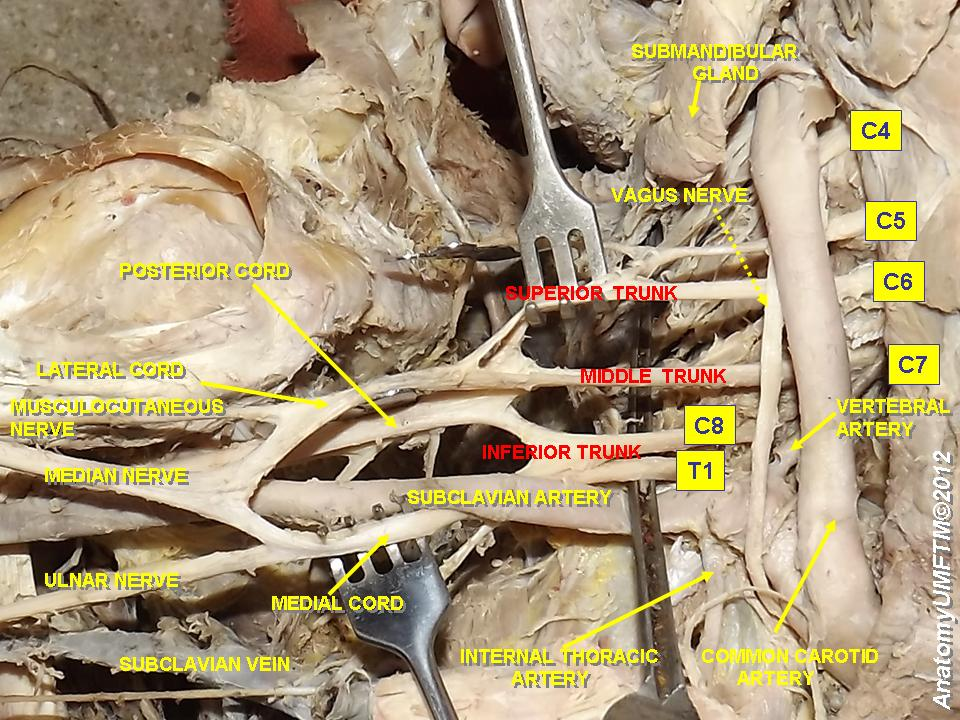
Brachial plexus and common carotid artery

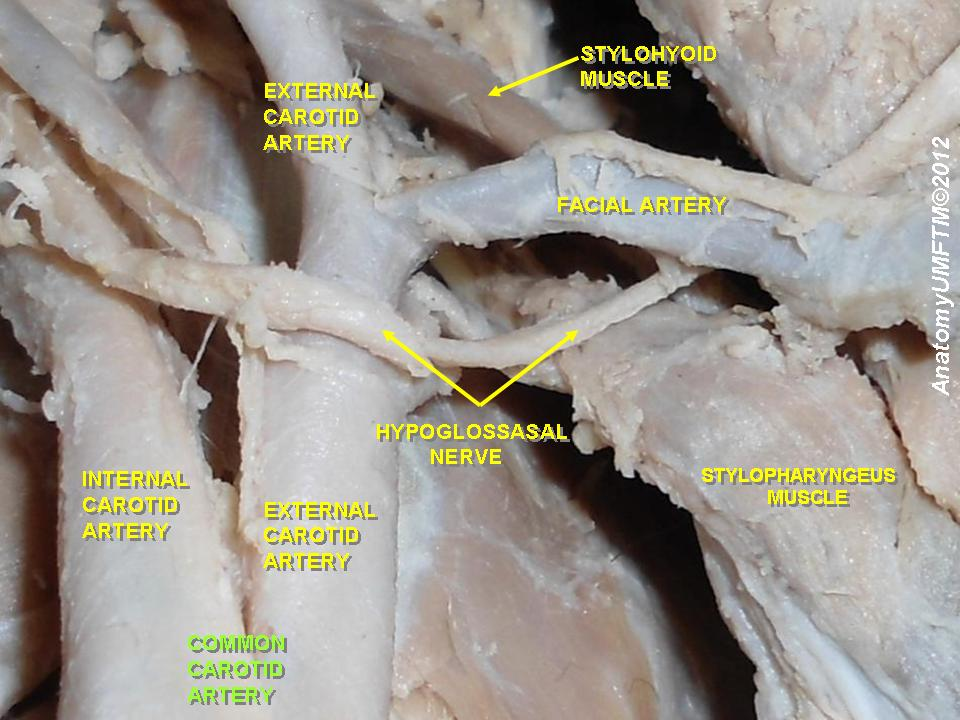
Common carotid artery

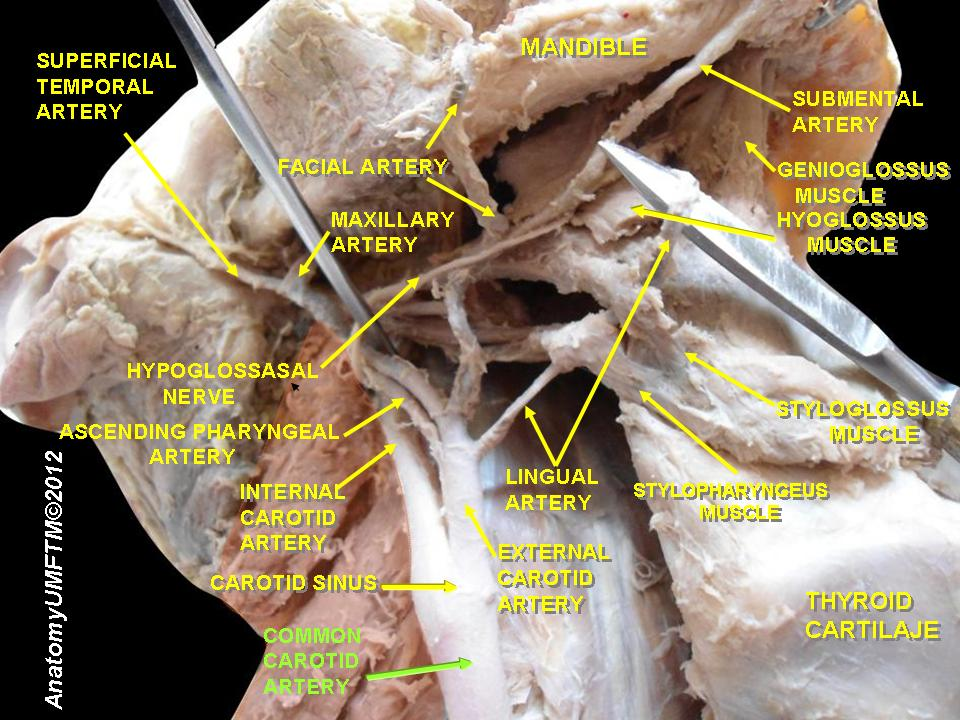
Common carotid artery

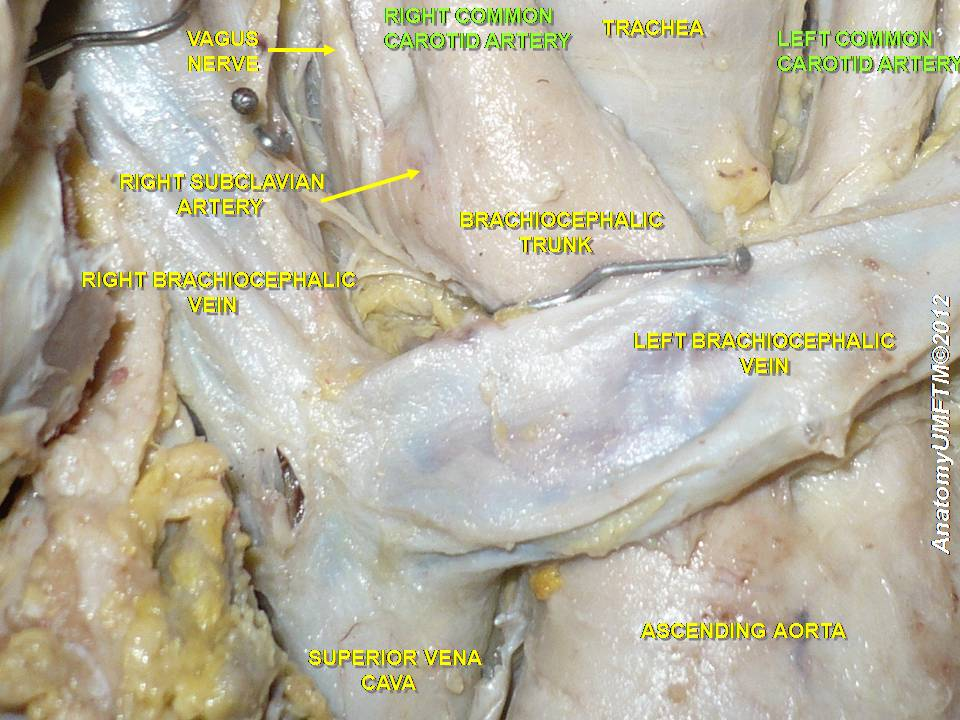
Right and left common carotid arteries

== See also ==
- Head and neck anatomy
- Carotid sheath
- Carotid sinus
- Carotid body
- Carotid Doppler machine
- Carotidynia
