= Thyroid veins =

Thyroid veins can refer to:

- Inferior thyroid veins
- Middle thyroid vein
- Superior thyroid vein
