= Superior thyroid =

Superior thyroid may refer to:

- Superior thyroid artery
- Superior thyroid vein
