= Trachea =

Cartilaginous tube

- Human trachea

Details
- Pronunciation: /trəˈkiːə, ˈtreɪkiə/
- Part of: Respiratory tract
- Artery: Tracheal branches of inferior thyroid artery
- Vein: Brachiocephalic vein, azygos vein, accessory hemiazygos vein

Identifiers
- Latin: trachea
- MeSH: D014132
- TA98: A06.3.01.001
- TA2: 3213
- FMA: 7394

The trachea (pl.: tracheae or tracheas), also known as the windpipe, is a cartilaginous tube that connects the larynx to the bronchi of the lungs, allowing the passage of air, and so is present in almost all land vertebrate animals' lungs. The trachea extends from the larynx and branches into the two primary bronchi. At the top of the trachea, the cricoid cartilage attaches it to the larynx. The trachea is formed by a number of horseshoe-shaped rings, joined together vertically by overlying ligaments, and by the trachealis muscle at their ends. The epiglottis closes the opening to the larynx during swallowing.

The trachea begins to form in the second month of embryo development, becoming longer and more fixed in its position over time. Its epithelium is lined with column-shaped cells that have hair-like extensions called cilia, with scattered goblet cells that produce protective mucins. The trachea can be affected by inflammation or infection, usually as a result of a viral illness affecting other parts of the respiratory tract, such as the larynx and bronchi, called croup, that can result in a cough. Infection with bacteria usually affects the trachea only and can cause narrowing or even obstruction. As a major part of the respiratory tract, the trachea, when obstructed, prevents air from entering the lungs; thus, a tracheostomy may be required. Additionally, during surgery, if mechanical ventilation is required during anaesthesia, a tube is inserted into the trachea: this is called tracheal intubation.

In insects, the word "trachea" is used for a very different organ than in vertebrates. The respiratory system of insects consists of spiracles, tracheae, and tracheoles, which together transport metabolic gases to and from tissues.

== Structure ==
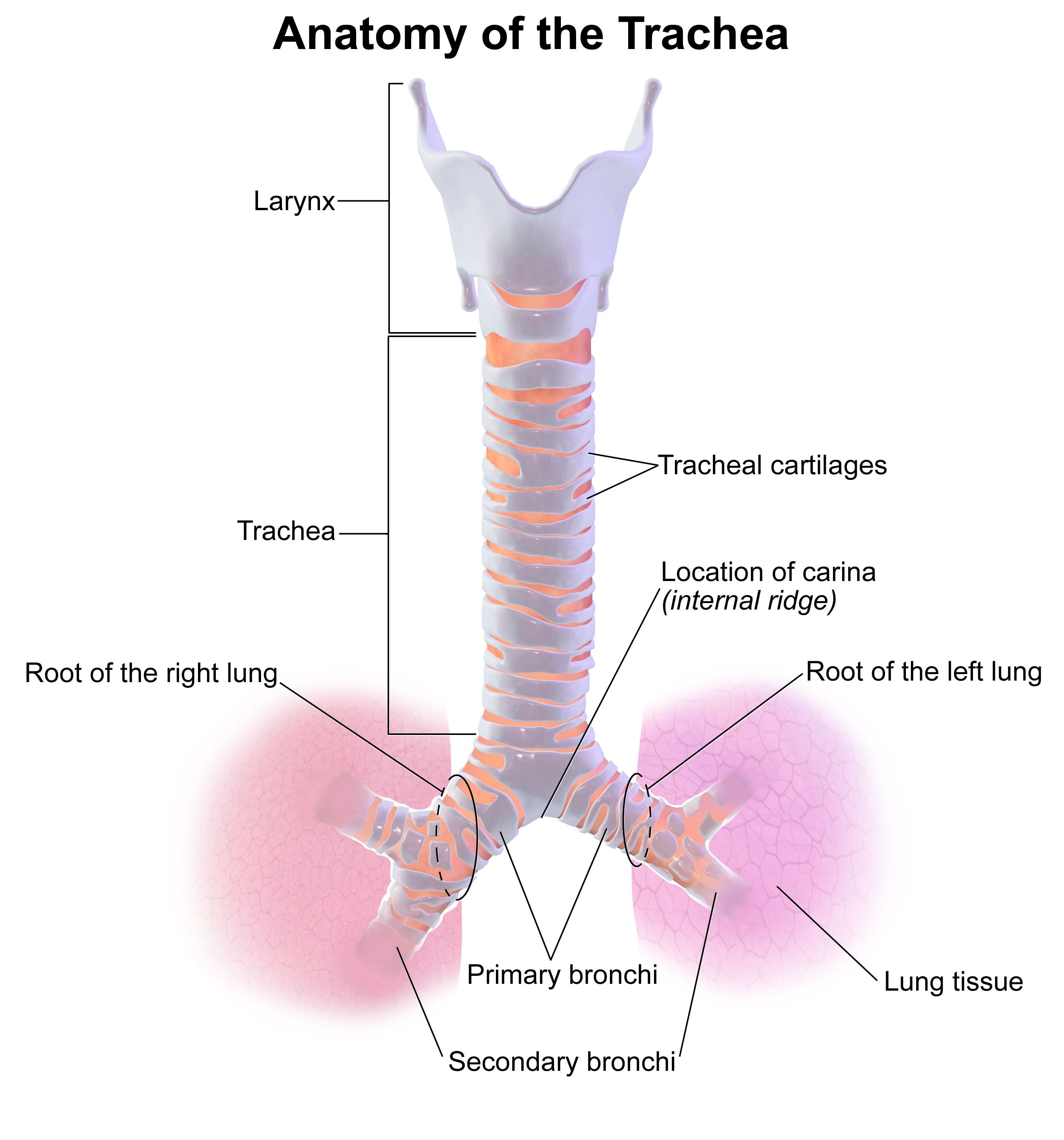

An adult's trachea has an inner diameter of about 1.5 to 2 centimetres (1/2 to 3/4 in) and a length of about 10 to 11 cm (4 to 4 1/4 in), wider in males than females. The trachea begins at the lower edge of the cricoid cartilage of the larynx at the level of sixth cervical vertebra (C6) and ends at the carina, the point where the trachea branches into left and right main bronchi., at the level of the fourth thoracic vertebra (T4), although its position may change with breathing. The trachea is surrounded by 16–20 rings of hyaline cartilage; these 'rings' are 4 millimetres high in the adult, incomplete and C-shaped. Ligaments connect the rings. The trachealis muscle connects the ends of the incomplete rings and runs along the back wall of the trachea. Also adventitia, which is the outermost layer of connective tissue that surrounds the hyaline cartilage, contributes to the trachea's ability to bend and stretch with movement.

Although trachea is a midline structure, it can be displaced normally to the right by the aortic arch.

=== Nearby structures ===
The trachea passes by many structures of the neck and chest (thorax) along its course.

In front of the upper trachea lies connective tissue and skin. Several other structures pass over or sit on the trachea; the jugular arch, which joins the two anterior jugular veins, sits in front of the upper part of the trachea. The sternohyoid and sternothyroid muscles stretch along its length. The thyroid gland also stretches across the upper trachea, with the isthmus overlying the second to fourth rings, and the lobes stretching to the level of the fifth or sixth cartilage. The blood vessels of the thyroid rest on the trachea next to the isthmus; superior thyroid arteries join just above it, and the inferior thyroid veins below it. In front of the lower trachea lies the manubrium of the sternum, the remnants of the thymus in adults. To the front left lie the large blood vessels the aortic arch and its branches the left common carotid artery and the brachiocephalic trunk; and the left brachiocephalic vein. The deep cardiac plexus and lymph nodes are also positioned in front of the lower trachea.

Behind the trachea, along its length, sits the oesophagus, followed by connective tissue and the vertebral column. To its sides run the carotid arteries and inferior thyroid arteries; and to its sides on its back surface run the recurrent laryngeal nerves in the upper trachea, and the vagus nerves in the lower trachea.

The trachealis muscle contracts during coughing, reducing the size of the lumen of the trachea.

CT scan of the thorax (axial lung window)

CT scan of the thorax (coronal lung window)

CT scan of the thorax (coronal mediastinal window)

Cross section of a trachea and esophagus

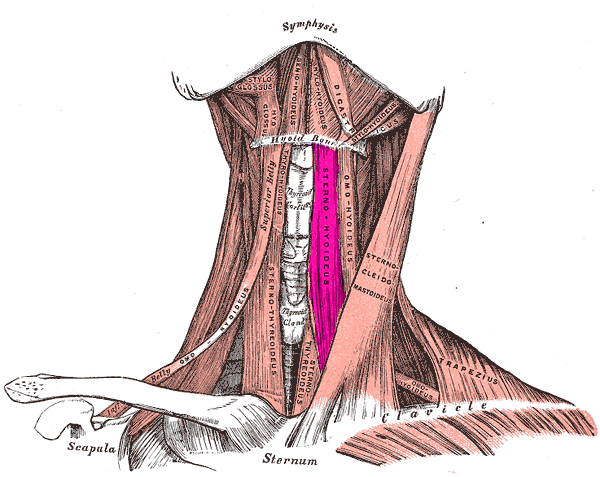
The sternohyoid and sternothyroid muscles lie on top of the upper part of the trachea

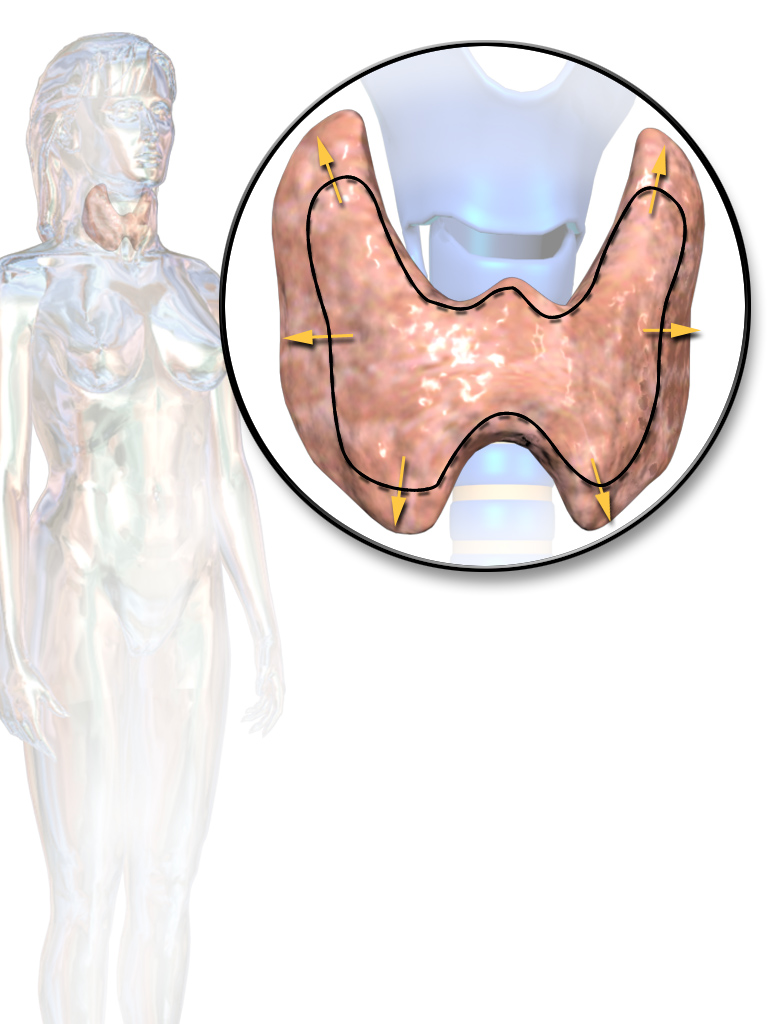
The thyroid gland also lies on top of the trachea, and lies below the cricoid cartilage.

=== Blood and lymphatic supply ===
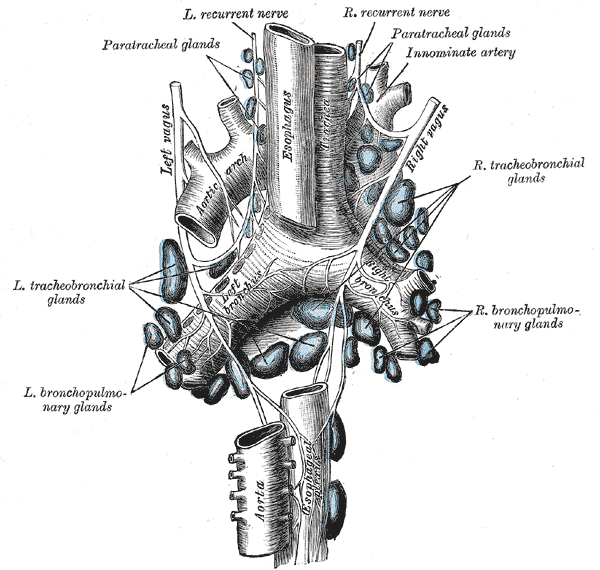
Lymph nodes of the trachea

The upper part of trachea receives and drains blood through the inferior thyroid arteries and veins; the lower trachea receives blood from bronchial arteries. Arteries that supply the trachea do so via small branches that supply the trachea from the sides. As the branches approach the wall of the trachea, they split into inferior and superior branches, which join with the branches of the arteries above and below; these then split into branches that supply the anterior and posterior parts of the trachea. The inferior thyroid arteries arise just below the isthmus of the thyroid, which sits atop the trachea. These arteries join (anastamoses) with ascending branches of the bronchial arteries, which are direct branches from the aorta, to supply blood to the trachea. The lymphatic vessels of the trachea drain into the pretracheal nodes that lie in front of the trachea, and paratracheal lymph nodes that lie beside it.

=== Development ===
In the fourth week of development of the human embryo as the respiratory bud grows, the trachea separates from the foregut through the formation of ridges which eventually separate the trachea from the oesophagus, the tracheoesophageal septum. This separates the future trachea from the oesophagus and divides the foregut tube into the laryngotracheal tube. By the start of the fifth week, the left and right main bronchi have begun to form, initially as buds at the terminal end of the trachea.

The trachea is no more than 4 mm in diameter during the first year of life, expanding to its adult diameter of approximately 2 cm by late childhood. The trachea is more circular and more vertical in children compared to adults, varies more in size, and also varies more in its position in relation to its surrounding structures.

=== Microanatomy ===
The trachea is lined with a layer of interspersed layers of column-shaped cells with cilia. The epithelium contains goblet cells, which are glandular, column-shaped cells that produce mucins, the main component of mucus. Mucus helps to moisten and protect the airways. Mucus lines the ciliated cells of the trachea to trap inhaled foreign particles that the cilia then waft upward toward the larynx and then the pharynx where it can be either swallowed into the stomach or expelled as phlegm. This self-clearing mechanism is termed mucociliary clearance. Directly beneath this mucus layer lies the submucosa layer which is composed primarily of fibrous connective tissue and connects the mucosa to the rings of hyaline cartilage beneath.

The trachea is surrounded by 16 to 20 rings of hyaline cartilage; these 'rings' are incomplete and C-shaped. Two or more of the cartilages often unite, partially or completely, and they are sometimes bifurcated at their extremities. The rings are generally highly elastic but they may calcify with age.

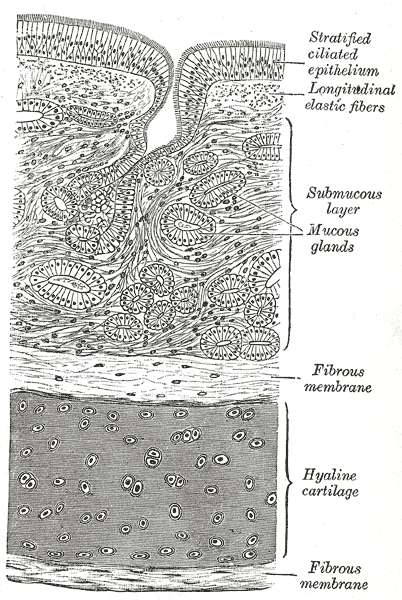
Cross-section

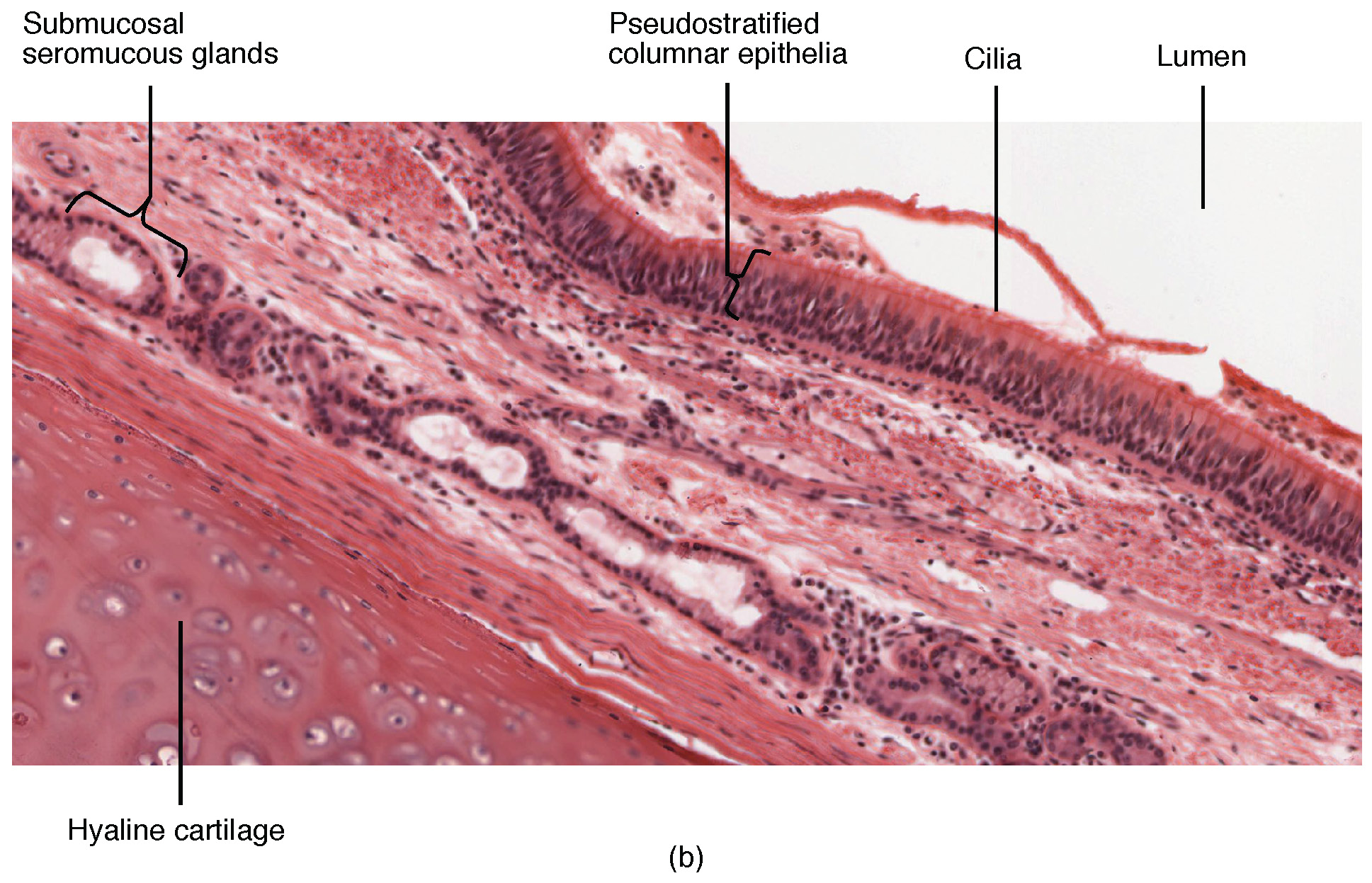
Cross-section of the trachea, with pseudostratified ciliated columnar epithelium and goblet cells labelled

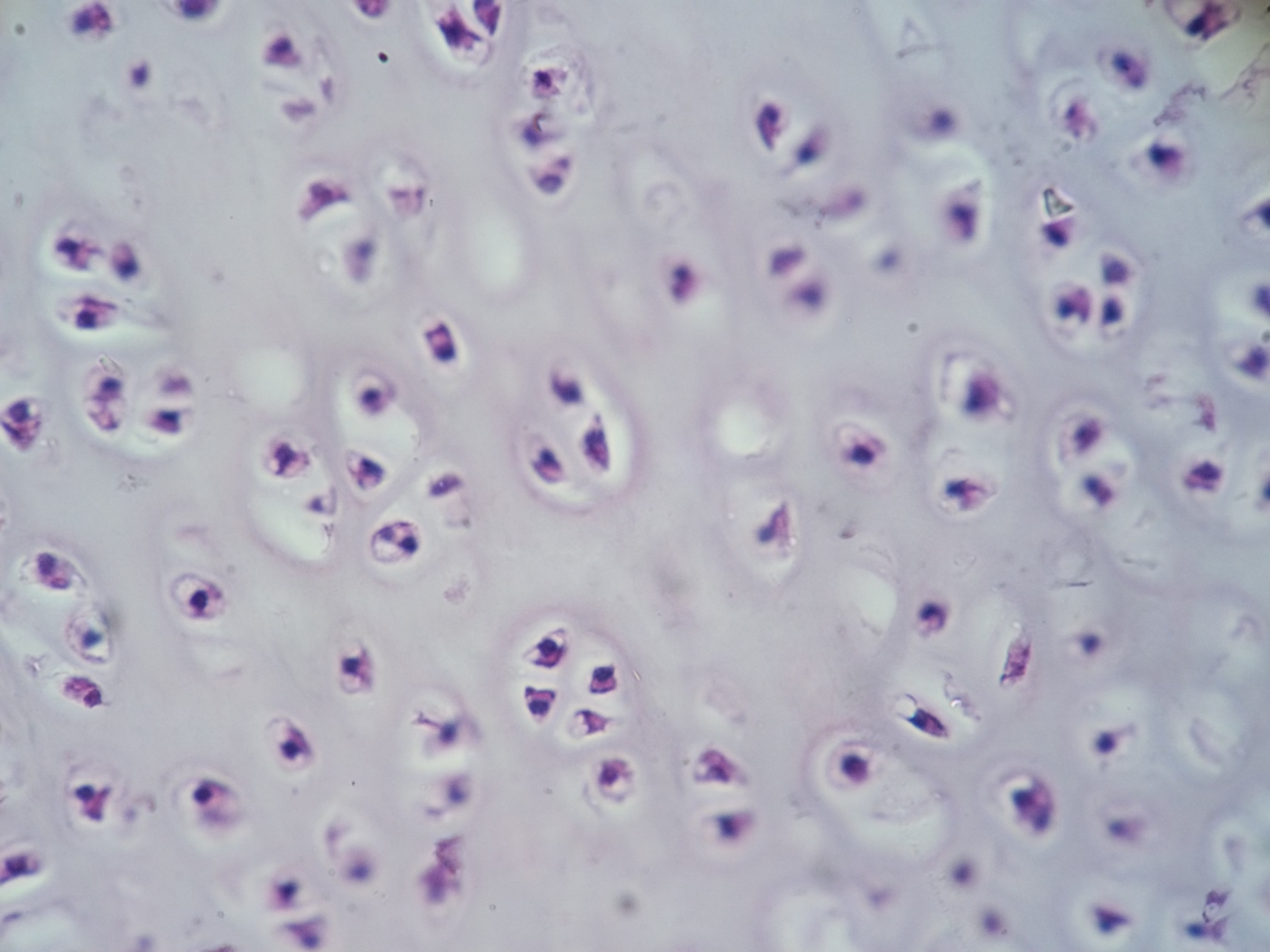
Magnified cross-section of the cartilage of the trachea

== Function ==
The trachea's main function is to transport air to and from the lungs. It also helps to warm, humidify, and filter the air before it reaches the lungs.

The trachea is made up of rings of cartilage, which help to keep it open and prevent it from collapsing. The inside of the trachea is lined with a mucous membrane, which produces mucus to help trap dirt and dust particles. The cilia, which are tiny hairs that line the mucous membrane, help to move the mucus and trapped particles up and out of the trachea.

== Clinical significance ==
=== Inflammation and infection ===
Inflammation of the trachea is known as tracheitis, usually due to an infection. It is usually caused by viral infections, with bacterial infections occurring almost entirely in children. Most commonly, infections occur with inflammation of other parts of the respiratory tract, such as the larynx and bronchi, known as croup, however bacterial infections may also affect the trachea alone, although they are often associated with a recent viral infection. Viruses that cause croup are generally the parainfluenza viruses 1–3, with influenza viruses A and B also causing croup, but usually causing more serious infections; bacteria may also cause croup and include Staphylococcus aureus, Haemophilus influenzae, Streptococcus pneumoniae and Moraxella catarrhalis. Causes of bacterial infection of the trachea are most commonly Staphylococcus aureus and Streptococcus pneumoniae. In patients who are in hospital, additional bacteria that may cause tracheitis include Escherichia coli, Klebsiella pneumoniae, and Pseudomonas aeruginosa.

A person affected with tracheitis may start with symptoms that suggest an upper respiratory tract infection such as a cough, sore throat, or coryzal symptoms such as a runny nose. Fevers may develop and an affected child may develop difficulty breathing and sepsis. Swelling of the airway can cause narrowing of the airway, causing a hoarse breathing sound called stridor, or even cause complete blockage. Up to 80% of people affected by bacterial tracheitis require the use of mechanical ventilation, and treatment may include endoscopy for the purposes of acquiring microbiological specimens for culture and sensitivity, as well as removal of any dead tissue associated with the infection. Treatment in such situations usually includes antibiotics.

=== Narrowing ===
An example of stridor, which develops when the trachea is narrowed or obstructed

A trachea may be narrowed or compressed, usually a result of enlarged nearby lymph nodes; cancers of the trachea or nearby structures; large thyroid goitres; or rarely as a result of other processes such as unusually swollen blood vessels. Scarring from tracheobronchial injury or intubation; or inflammation associated with granulomatosis with polyangiitis may also cause a narrowing of the trachea (tracheal stenosis). Obstruction invariably causes a harsh breathing sound known as stridor. A camera inserted via the mouth down into the trachea, called bronchoscopy, may be performed to investigate the cause of an obstruction. Management of obstructions depends on the cause. Obstructions as a result of malignancy may be managed with surgery, chemotherapy or radiotherapy. A stent may be inserted over the obstruction. Benign lesions, such as narrowing resulting from scarring, are likely to be surgically excised.

One cause of narrowing is tracheomalacia, which is the tendency for the trachea to collapse when there is increased external pressure, such as when airflow is increased during breathing in or out, due to decreased compliance. It can be due to congenital causes, or due to things that develop after birth, such as compression from nearby masses or swelling, or trauma. Congenital tracheomalacia can occur by itself or in association with other abnormalities such as bronchomalacia or laryngomalacia, and abnormal connections between the trachea and the oesophagus, amongst others. Congenital tracheomalacia often improves without specific intervention; when required, interventions may include beta agonists and muscarinic agonists, which enhance the tone of the smooth muscle surrounding the trachea; positive pressure ventilation, or surgery, which may include the placement of a stent, or the removal of the affected part of the trachea. In dogs, particularly miniature dogs and toy dogs, tracheomalacia, as well as bronchomalacia, can lead to tracheal collapse, which often presents with a honking goose-like cough.

=== Injury ===
The trachea may be injured by trauma such as in a vehicle accident, or intentionally by another willfully inflicting damage for example as practiced in some martial arts.

=== Intubation ===
Tracheal intubation refers to the insertion of a tube down the trachea. This procedure is commonly performed during surgery, in order to ensure a person receives enough oxygen when sedated. The catheter is connected to a machine that monitors the airflow, oxygenation and several other metrics. This is often one of the responsibilities of an anaesthetist during surgery.

In an emergency, or when tracheal intubation is deemed impossible, a tracheotomy is often performed to insert a tube for ventilation, usually when needed for particular types of surgery to be carried out so that the airway can be kept open. The provision of the opening via a tracheotomy is called a tracheostomy. Another method procedure can be carried, in an emergency situation, and this is a cricothyrotomy.

=== Congenital disorders ===
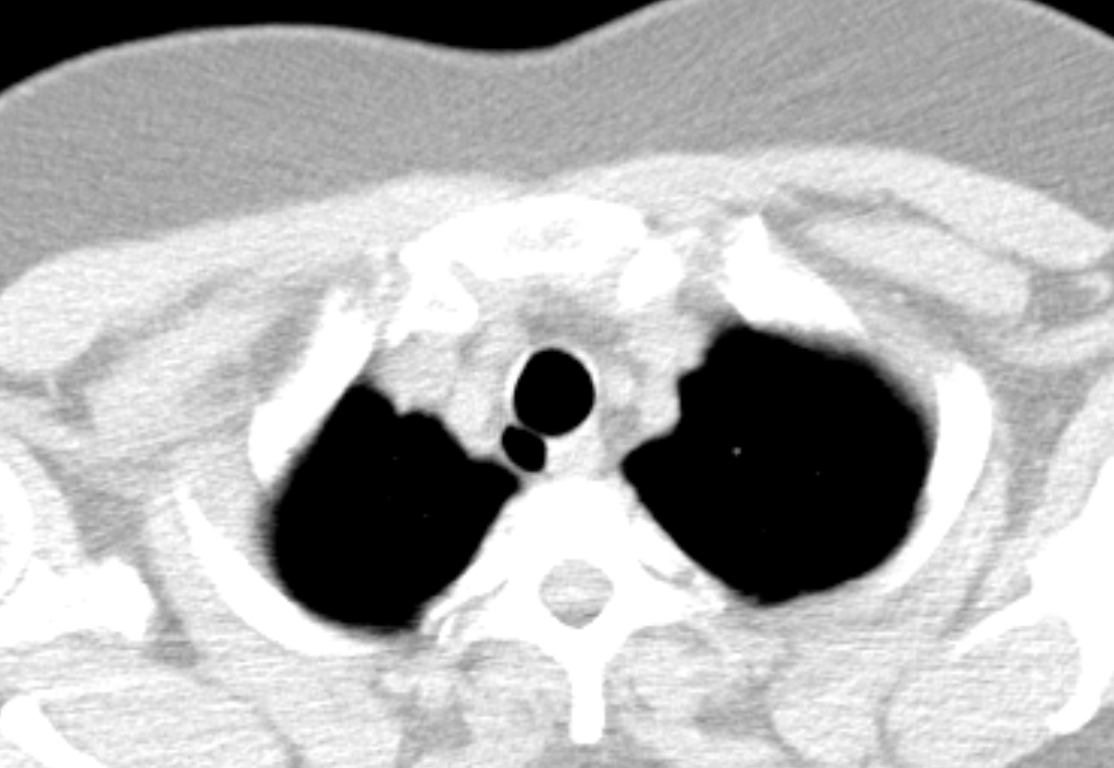
Tracheal diverticulum as seen on axial CT imaging

Tracheal agenesis is a rare birth defect in which the trachea fails to develop. The defect is usually fatal though sometimes surgical intervention has been successful.

A tracheoesophageal fistula is a congenital defect in which the trachea and esophagus are abnormally connected (a fistula). This is because of abnormalities in the separation between the trachea and oesophagus during development. This occurs in approximately 1 in 3,000 births, and the most common abnormalities is a separation of the upper and lower ends of the oesophagus, with the upper end finishing in a closed pouch. Other abnormalities may be associated with this, including cardiac abnormalities, or VACTERL syndrome. Such fistulas may be detected before a baby is born because of excess amniotic fluid; after birth, they are often associated with pneumonitis and pneumonia because of aspiration of food contents. Congenital fistulas are often treated by surgical repair. In adults, fistulas may occur because of erosion into the trachea from nearby malignant tumours, which erode into both the trachea and the oesophagus. Initially, these often result in coughing from swallowed contents of the oesophagus that are aspirated through the trachea, often progressing to fatal pneumonia; there is rarely a curative treatment. A tracheo-oesophageal puncture is a surgically created hole between the trachea and the esophagus in a person who has had their larynx removed. Air travels upwards from the surgical connection to the upper oesophagus and the pharynx, creating vibrations that create sound that can be used for speech. The purpose of the puncture is to restore a person's ability to speak after the vocal cords have been removed.

Sometimes as an anatomical variation one or more of the tracheal rings are formed as complete rings, rather than horseshoe shaped rings. These O rings are smaller than the normal C-shaped rings and can cause narrowing (stenosis) of the trachea, resulting in breathing difficulties. An operation called a slide tracheoplasty can open up the rings and rejoin them as wider rings, shortening the length of the trachea. Slide tracheoplasty is said to be the best option in treating tracheal stenosis.

Mounier-Kuhn syndrome is a rare congenital disorder of an abnormally enlarged trachea, characterised by absent elastic fibres, smooth muscle thinning, and a tendency to get recurrent respiratory tract infections.

=== Replacement ===
From 2008, operations have experimentally replaced tracheas, with those grown from stem cells, or with synthetic substitutes, however this is regarded as experimental and there is no standardised method. Difficulties with ensuring adequate blood supply to the replaced trachea is considered a major challenge to any replacement. Additionally, no evidence has been found to support the placement of stem cells taken from bone marrow on the trachea as a way of stimulating tissue regeneration, and such a method remains hypothetical.

In January 2021, surgeons at Mount Sinai Hospital in New York performed the first complete trachea transplantation. The 18-hour procedure included harvesting a trachea from a donor and implanting it in the patient, connecting numerous veins and arteries to provide sufficient blood flow to the organ.

== Other vertebrates ==
Allowing for variations in the length of the neck, the trachea in other mammals, and reptiles, is generally similar to that in humans. There are some variations, for example, in birds the trachea runs from the pharynx to the syrinx, from which the primary bronchi diverge. Swans have an unusually elongated trachea, part of which is coiled beneath the sternum; this may act as a resonator to amplify sound. In some birds, the tracheal rings are complete, and may even be ossified.

In amphibianss, the trachea is normally extremely short and leads directly into the lungs, without clear primary bronchi. A longer trachea is, however, found in some long-necked salamanders, and in caecilians. While there are irregular cartilagenous nodules on the amphibian trachea, these do not form the rings found in amniotes such as mammals and reptiles.

The only known vertebrates to have lungs, but no trachea, are the lungfish and the Polypterus, in which the lungs arise directly from the pharynx.

== Insects and other arthropods ==
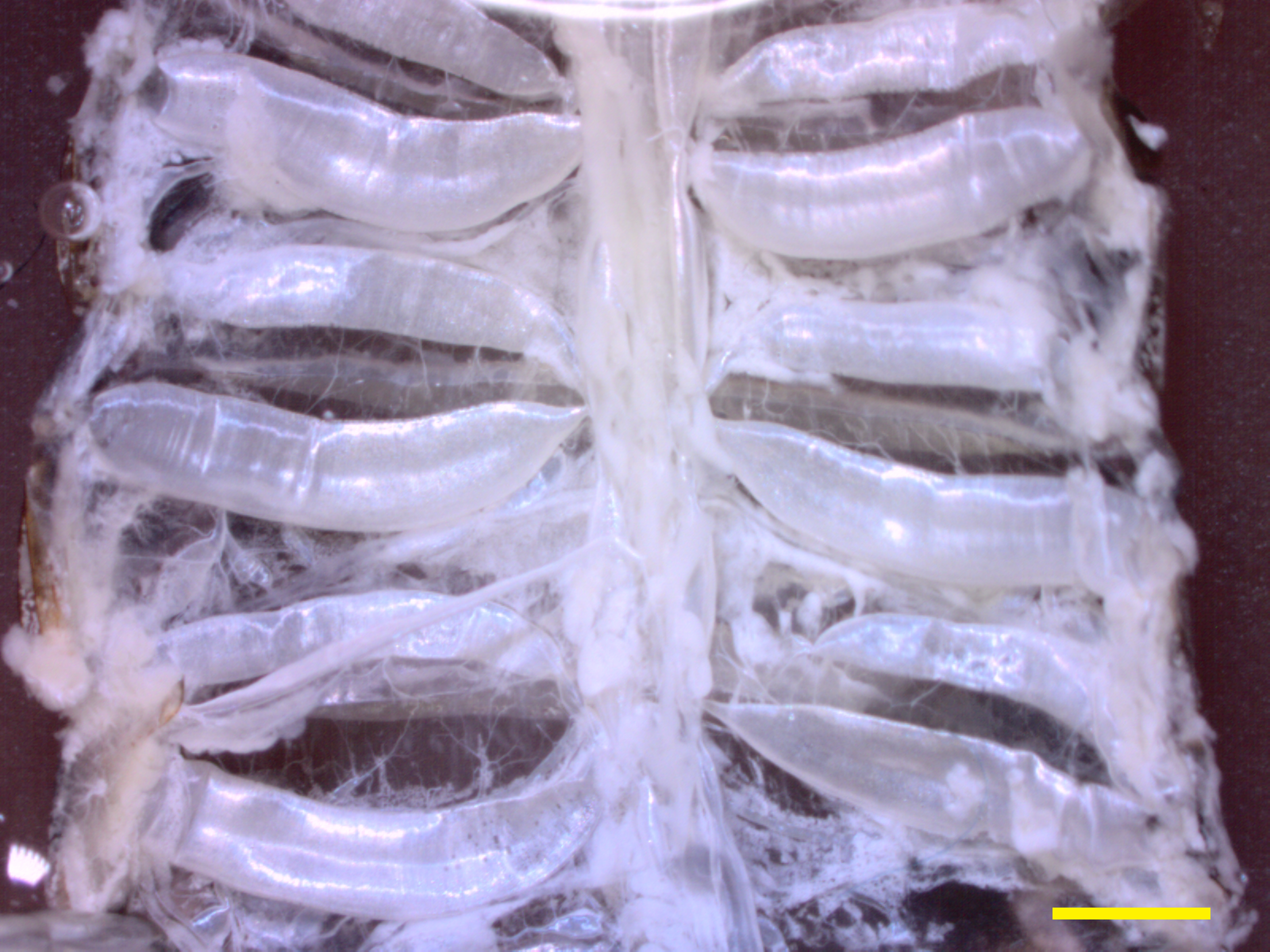
Tracheal system of dissected cockroach. The largest tracheae run across the width of the body of the cockroach and are horizontal in this image. Scale bar, 2 mm.

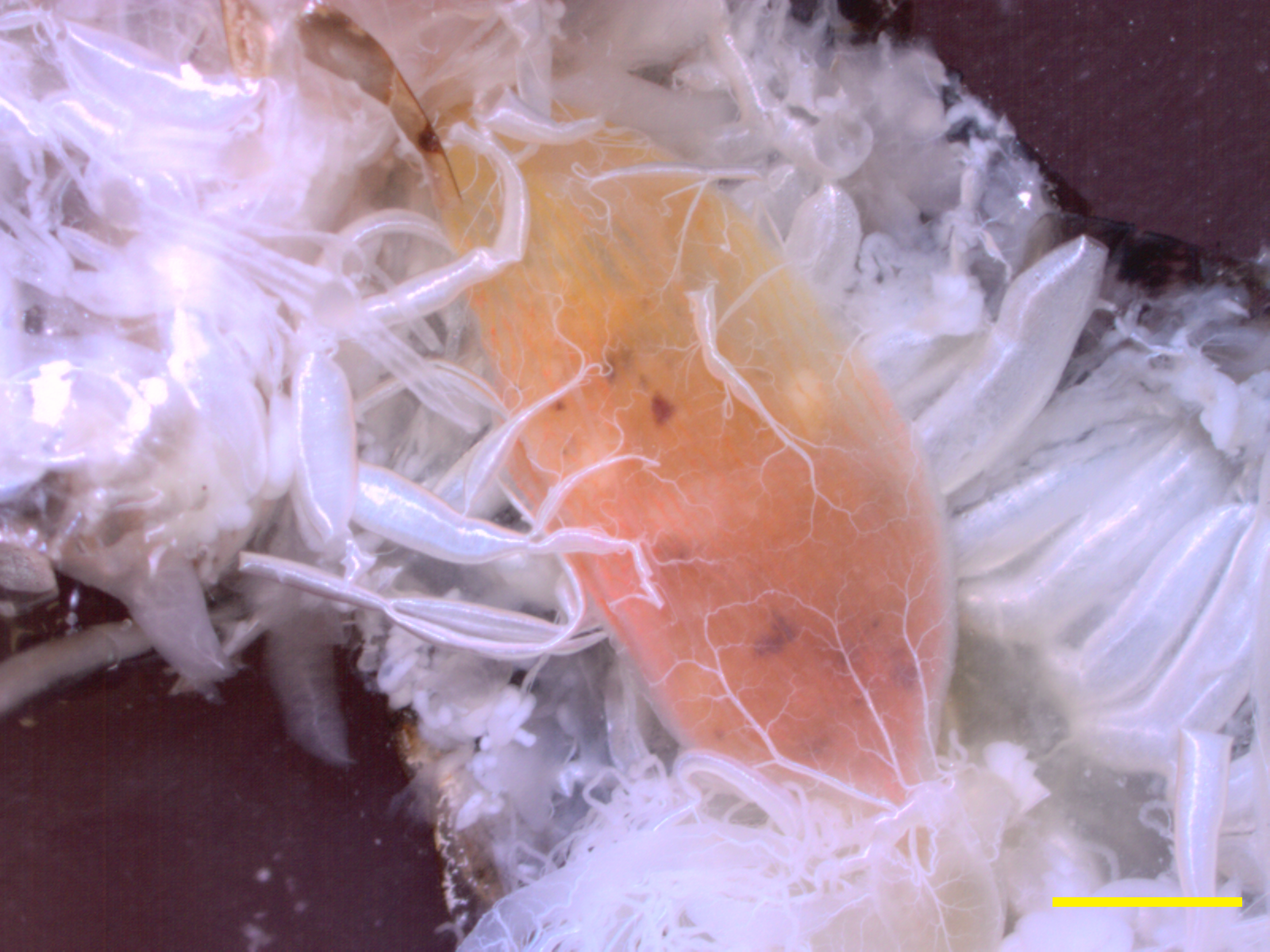
The tracheal system branches into progressively smaller tubes, here supplying the crop of the cockroach. Scale bar, 2 mm.

In insects and many other arthropods, the word "trachea" is used for a different organ than in vertebrates. They have an open respiratory system made up of spiracles, deep airways (tracheae) and tracheoles to conduct air directly to and from metabolic tissues. Unlike insects, some arachnids have tracheae aka spiracles leading to internal book lungs.

The distribution of spiracles can vary greatly among the many orders of insects, but in general each body segment can have only one pair of spiracles, each of which connects to an air cavity called atrium and has a relatively large tracheal tube behind it. The tracheae are invaginations of the cuticular exoskeleton that branch (anastomose) throughout the body with diameters from only a few micrometres up to 0.8 mm. Diffusion of oxygen and carbon dioxide takes place across the walls of the smallest tubes, called tracheoles, which penetrate tissues and even indent individual cells. Gas may be conducted through the respiratory system by means of active ventilation or passive diffusion. Unlike vertebrates, insects do not generally carry oxygen in their hemolymph. This is one of the factors that may limit their size.

An insect's tracheal tube may contain ridge-like circumferential rings of taenidia in various geometries such as loops or helices. Taenidia provide strength and flexibility to the trachea. In the head, thorax, or abdomen, tracheae may also be connected to air sacs. Many insects, such as grasshoppers and bees, which actively pump the air sacs in their abdomen, are able to control the flow of air through their body. In some aquatic insects, the tracheae exchange gas through the body wall directly, in the form of a gill, or function essentially as normal, via a plastron. Note that despite being internal, the tracheae of arthropods are lined with cuticular tissue and are shed during moulting (ecdysis).

== Additional images ==
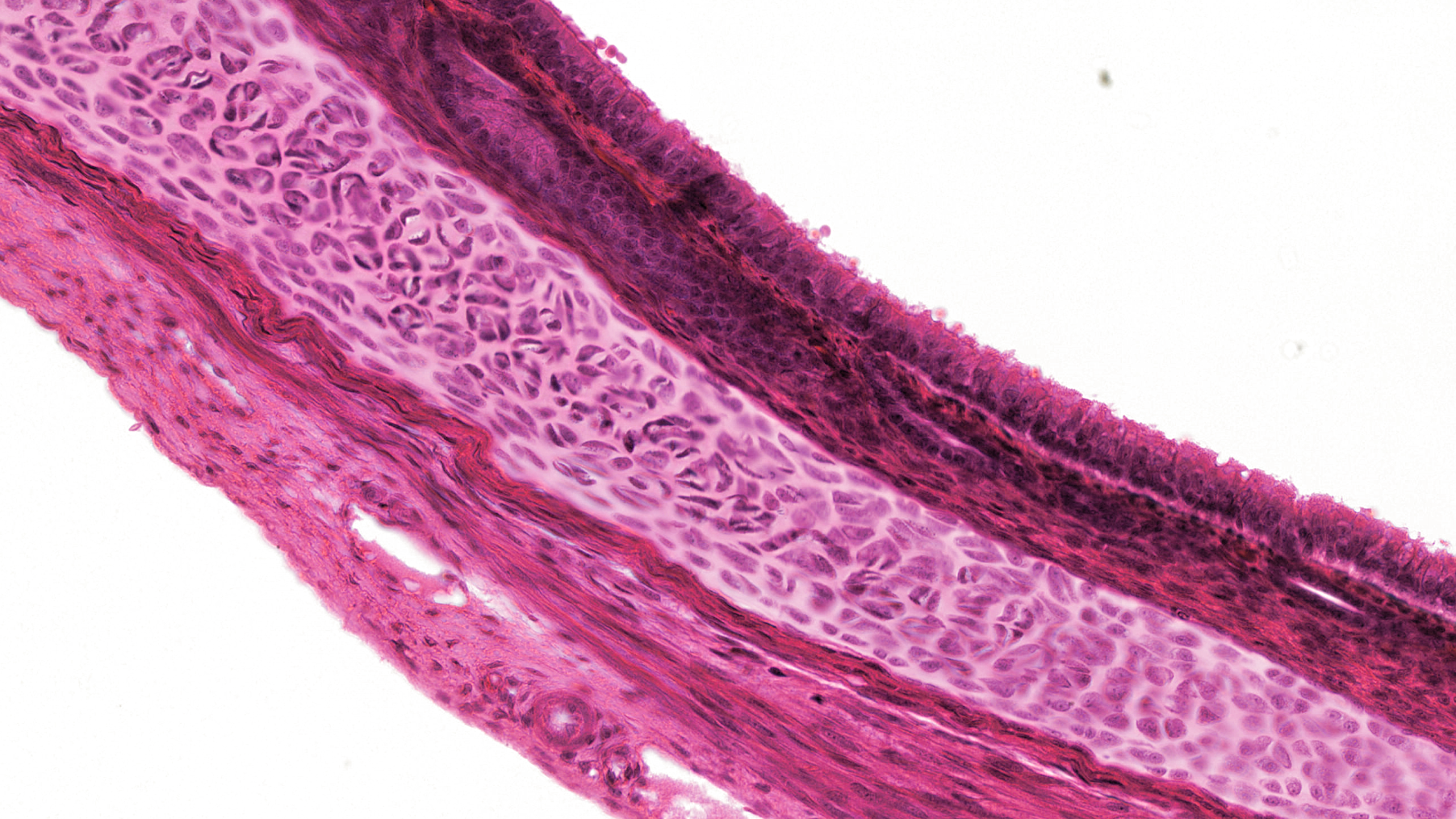
Trachea (mammal) cross-section high resolution

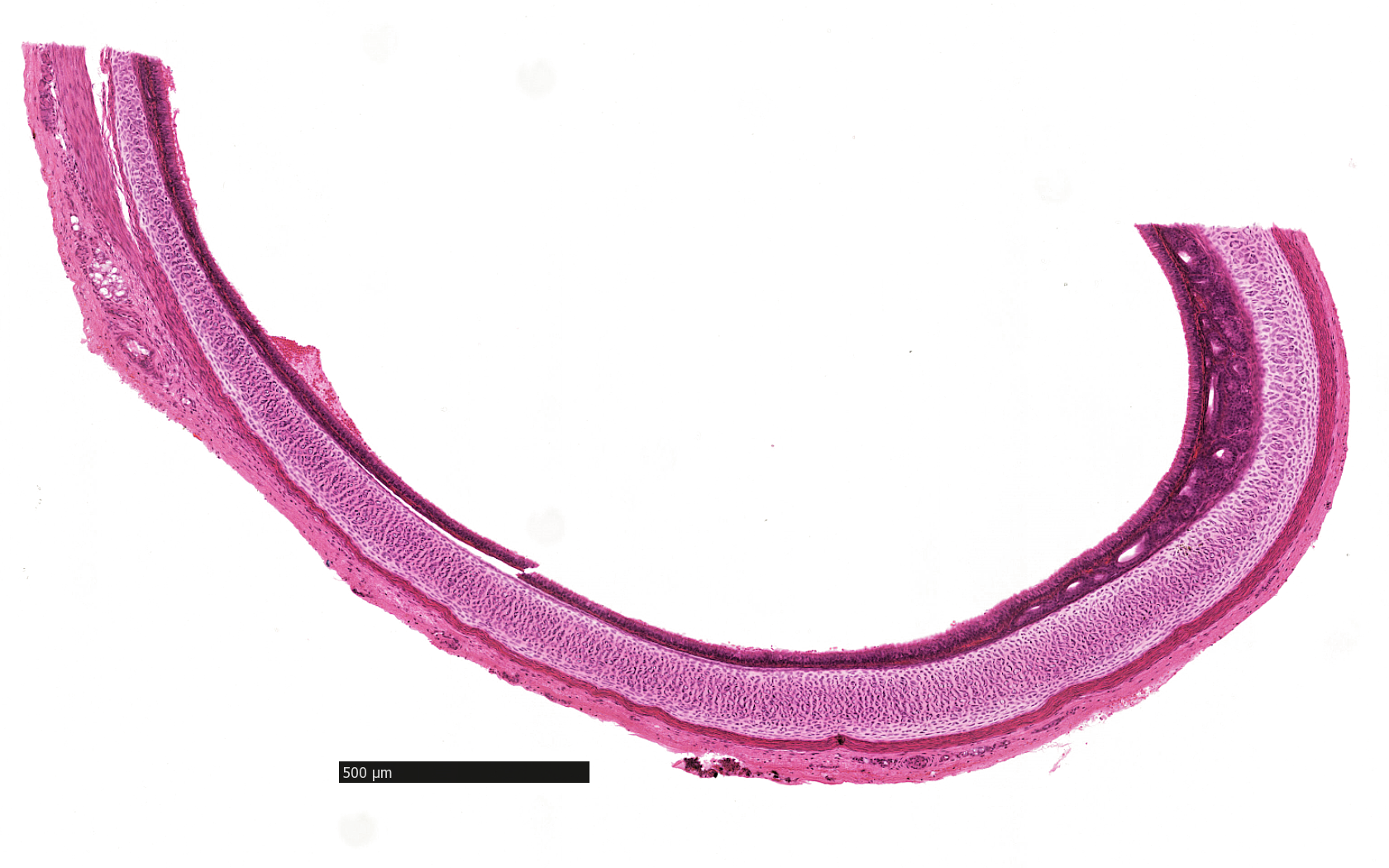
Trachea (mammal) cross-section low resolution

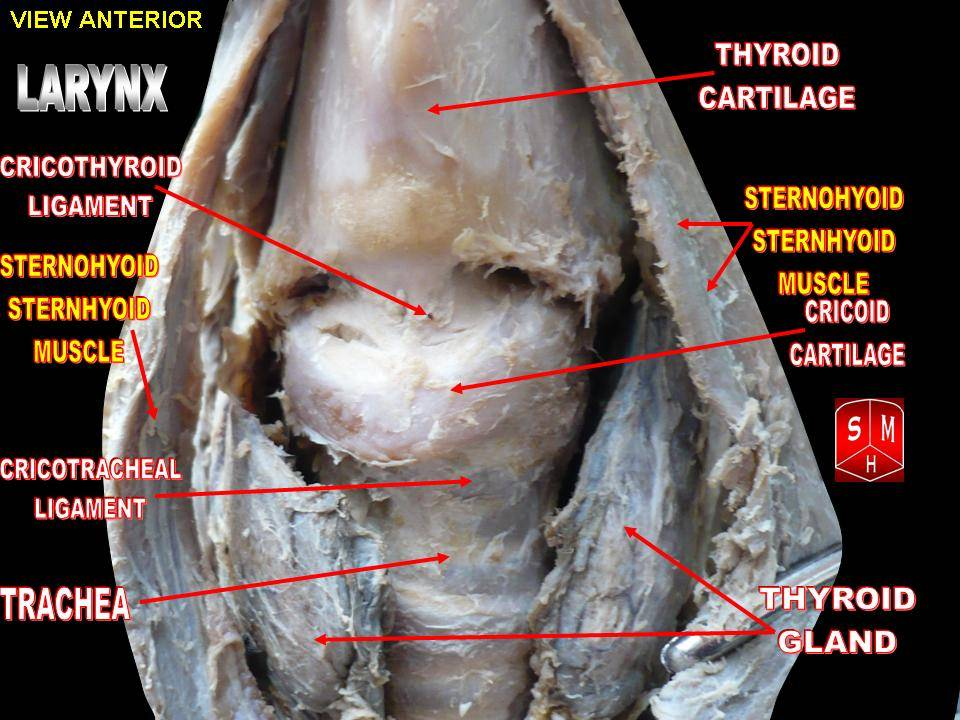
Trachea

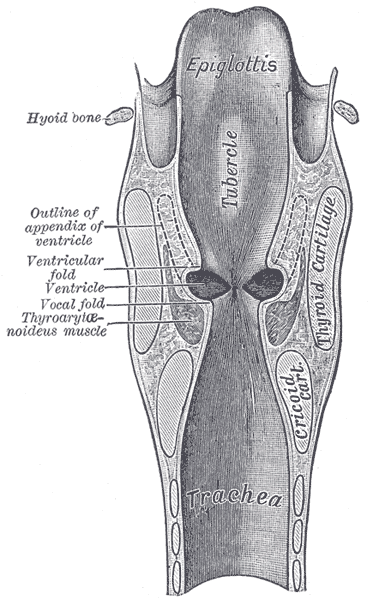
Coronal section of larynx and upper part of trachea

The graph representation of the 3D Reference Organ for Trachea, Male dataset.
