= Venous arch =

Venous arch may refer to:

- Plantar venous arch
- Jugular venous arch
- Dorsal venous arch of the foot
- Deep palmar venous arch
- Superficial palmar venous arch
