= Plexus pharyngeus =

Plexus pharyngeus or pharyngeal plexus can refer to:

- Pharyngeal plexus (venous) (plexus pharyngeus)
- Pharyngeal plexus of vagus nerve (plexus pharyngeus nervi vagi)
