= Laryngeal vein =

Laryngeal vein can refer to:

- Inferior laryngeal vein (vena laryngea inferior)
- Superior laryngeal vein (vena laryngea superior)
