= Inferior thyroid =

Inferior thyroid may refer to:

- Inferior thyroid veins
- Inferior thyroid artery
