= HJR =

HJR may refer to:

- Civil Aerodrome Khajuraho, in Madhya Pradesh, India
- Hampstead Junction Railway, in England
- Hedjaz Jordan Railway, in Jordan
- Hepatojugular reflux, also known as abdominojugular test
- The Henry James Review
- House joint resolution
