= Pharyngeal plexus of vagus nerve =

Pharyngeal plexus can refer to:

- Pharyngeal plexus of vagus nerve – a network of pharyngeal nerves
- Pharyngeal venous plexus – a network of pharyngeal veins
