= Jugular venous arch =

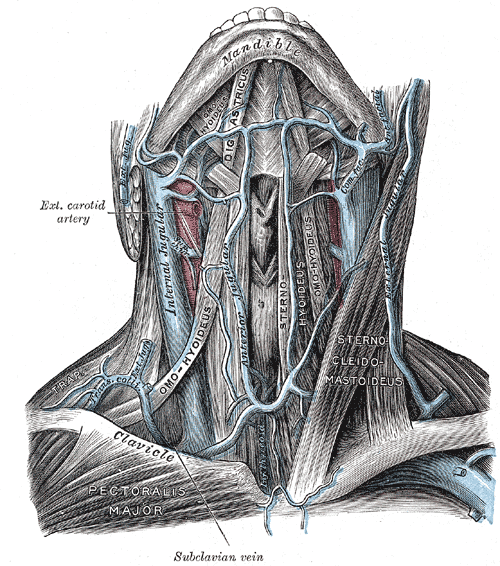
- The veins of the neck, viewed from in front. (Jugular venous arch visible but not labeled.)

Details
- Source: anterior jugular vein
- Drains to: External jugular vein or Subclavian vein

Identifiers
- Latin: arcus venosus jugularis
- TA98: A12.3.05.048
- TA2: 4960
- FMA: 50855

Just above the sternum the two anterior jugular veins communicate by a transverse trunk, the jugular venous arch (or venous jugular arch), which receive tributaries from the inferior thyroid veins; each also communicates with the internal jugular.

There are no valves in this vein.
