= Anterior jugular vein =

Blood vessel of the neck

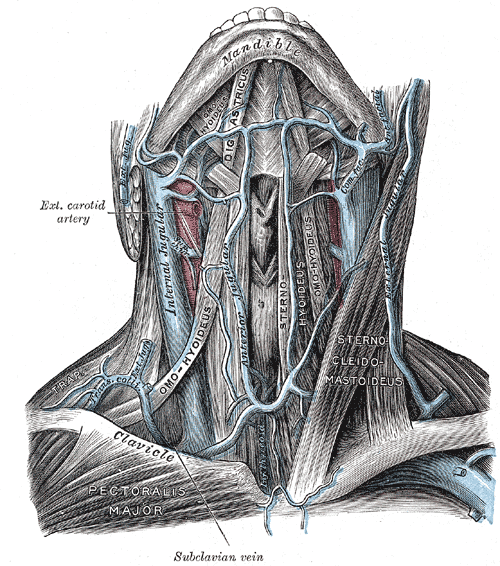
- The veins of the neck, viewed from in front (anterior jugular visible at center)

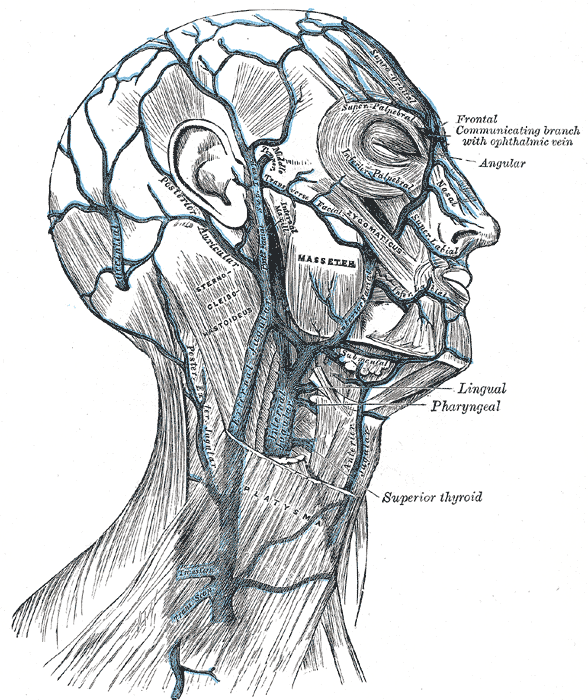
- Veins of the head and neck (anterior jugular visible at bottom right)

Details
- Drains to: External jugular vein

Identifiers
- Latin: vena jugularis anterior
- TA98: A12.3.05.047
- TA2: 4959
- FMA: 13318

The anterior jugular vein is a vein in the neck.

== Structure ==
The anterior jugular vein lies lateral to the cricothyroid membrane. It originates from near the hyoid bone by the confluence of several superficial veins in the submandibular region. Its tributaries are some laryngeal veins, and occasionally a small thyroid vein. It descends between the median line and the anterior border of the sternocleidomastoid muscle, and, at the lower part of the neck, passes beneath that muscle to open into the termination of the external jugular vein. Just above the sternum the two anterior jugular veins communicate by a transverse trunk, the venous jugular arch, which receive tributaries from the inferior thyroid veins; each also communicates with the internal jugular.

There are no valves in this vein.

The pretracheal lymph nodes follow the anterior jugular vein on each side of the midline.

=== Variation ===
The anterior jugular vein varies considerably in size, bearing usually an inverse proportion to the external jugular. Most frequently, there are two anterior jugulars, a right and left. However, there is sometimes only one.

A duplicate anterior jugular vein may be present on one side, which may cross over the midline.

== Clinical significance ==
=== Ultrasound ===
The anterior jugular vein, if present, is easily identified using ultrasound of the neck.

=== Tracheotomy ===
The anterior jugular vein may be damaged during tracheotomy, causing significant bleeding. The significant variation in vein course, such as duplicate veins, creates this risk. Performing a midline incision helps to avoid the anterior jugular vein.

== Additional images ==
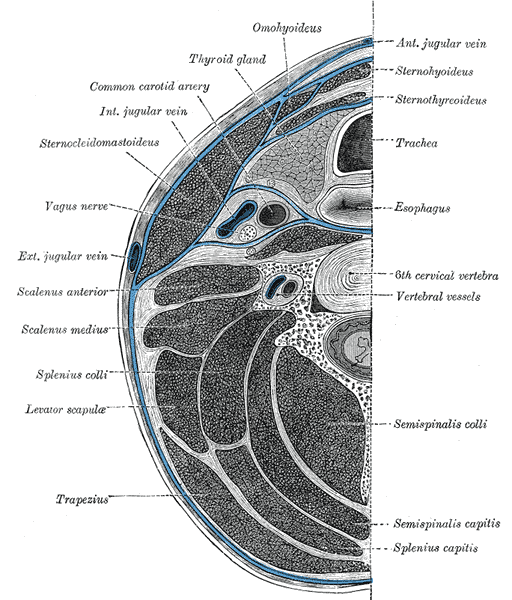
Section of the neck at about the level of the sixth cervical vertebra.

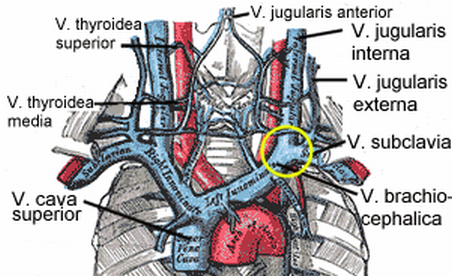
Veins of the neck and chest
