= Carotidynia =

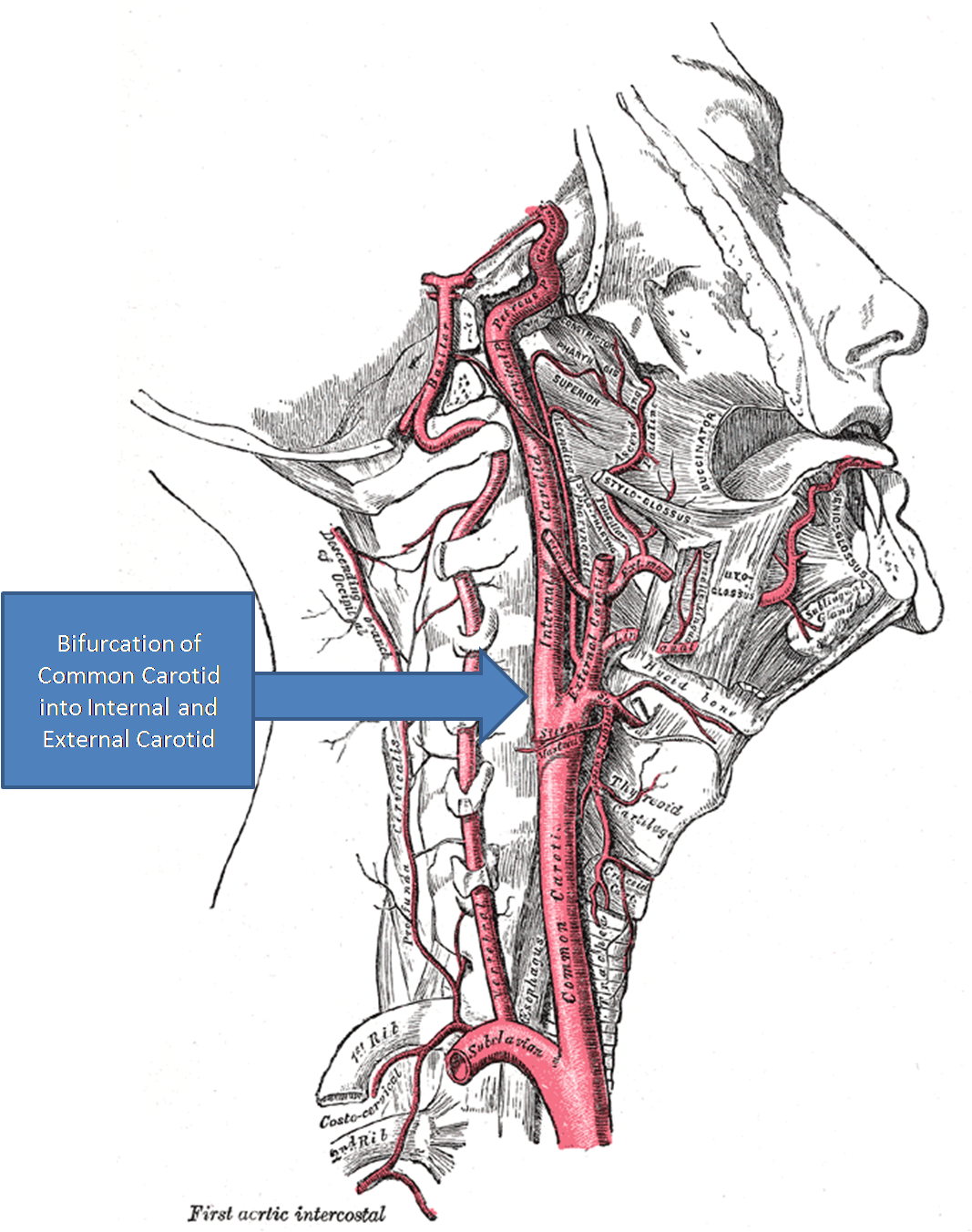
- Drawing from Gray's anatomy with blue arrow showing the bifurcation area which is painful in Carotidynia.

Carotidynia is a syndrome characterized by unilateral (one-sided) tenderness of the carotid artery, near the bifurcation. It was first described in 1927 by Temple Fay. The most common cause of carotidynia may be migraine, and then it is usually self-correcting. Common migraine treatments may help alleviate the carotidynia symptoms. Recent histological evidence has implicated an inflammatory component of carotidynia, but studies are limited. Carotid arteritis is a much less common cause of carotidynia, but has much more serious consequences. It is a form of giant cell arteritis, which is a condition that usually affects arteries in the head. Due to this serious condition possibly causing carotidynia, and the possibility that neck pain is related to some other non-carotidynia and serious condition, the case should be investigated by a medical doctor. Because carotidynia can be caused by numerous causes, Biousse and Bousser in 1994 recommended the term not be used in the medical literature. However, recent MRI and ultrasound studies have supported the existence of a differential diagnosis of carotidynia consistent with Fay's characterization.
