= Pretracheal lymph nodes =

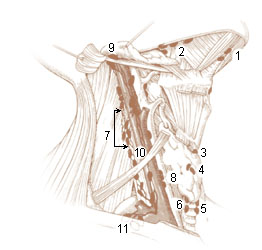
- 5. Pretracheal

Details
- System: Lymphatic system

Identifiers
- Latin: nodi lymphoidei praetracheales

The pretracheal lymph nodes are lymph nodes located anterior to the trachea in the neck.

== Structure ==
The pretracheal lymph nodes lie anterior to the trachea. They follow the anterior jugular veins either side of the midline. They drain into the deep cervical lymph nodes on the right and the thoracic duct on the left.
