= Inferior laryngeal vein =

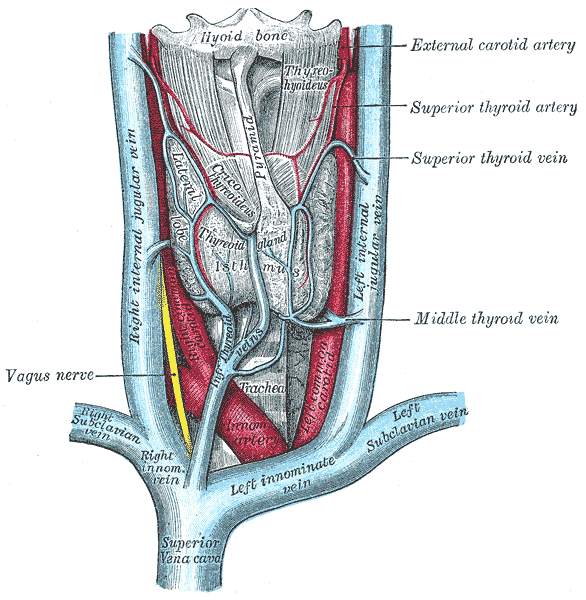
- Inferior thyroid veins visible at center.

Details
- Drains from: Larynx
- Drains to: Inferior thyroid vein
- Artery: Inferior laryngeal artery

Identifiers
- Latin: vena laryngea inferior
- TA98: A12.3.04.004
- TA2: 4797
- FMA: 50800

The inferior laryngeal vein is a vein which drains the larynx. It runs parallel to the laryngeal arteries.
