= Trachealis muscle =

Smooth muscle of the trachea

Details
- Nerve: Vagus nerve and upper thoracic spinal nerves
- Actions: Constricts trachea

Identifiers
- Latin: musculus trachealis
- TA98: A06.3.01.005
- TA2: 3219
- FMA: 7466

The trachealis muscle is a sheet of smooth muscle in the trachea.

== Structure ==
The trachealis muscle lies posterior to the trachea and anterior to the oesophagus. It bridges the gap between the free ends of C-shaped rings of cartilage at the posterior border of the trachea, adjacent to the oesophagus. This completes the ring of cartilages of the trachea. The trachealis muscle also supports a thin cartilage on the inside of the trachea. It is the only smooth muscle present in the trachea.

== Function ==
The primary function of the trachealis muscle is to constrict the trachea, allowing air to be expelled with more force, such as during coughing.

== Clinical significance ==
Tracheomalacia may involve hypotonia of the trachealis muscle.

The trachealis muscle may become stiffer during ageing, which makes the whole trachea less elastic.

In infants, the insertion of an oesophagogastroduodenoscope into the oesophagus may compress the trachealis muscle, and narrow the trachea. This can result in reduced airflow to the lungs. Infants may be intubated to make sure that the trachea is fixed open.

== See also ==
- Muscles of respiration
