= Middle thyroid vein =

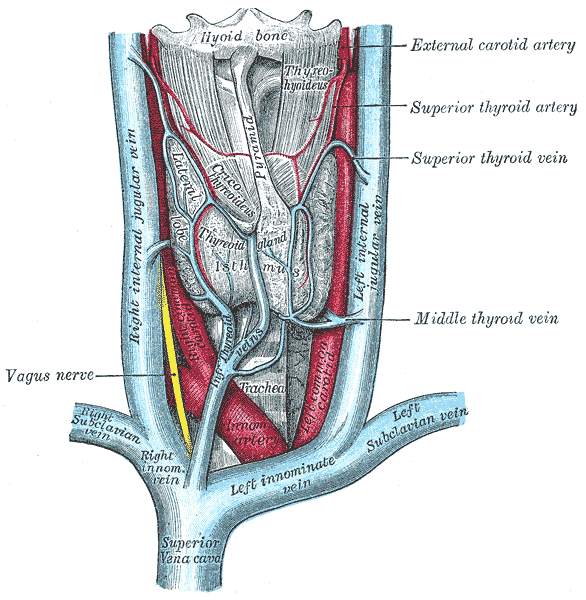
- The thyroid gland and its relations. (Middle thyroid vein labeled at center right.)

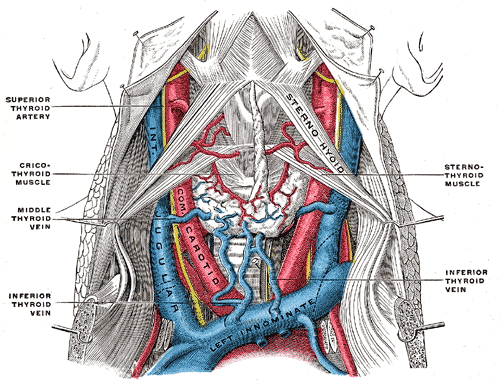
- The fascia and middle thyroid veins. (Middle thyroid vein labeled at center left.)

Details
- Drains from: Thyroid
- Drains to: Internal jugular vein

Identifiers
- Latin: vena thyreoidea media
- TA98: A12.3.05.015
- TA2: 4814
- FMA: 70843

The middle thyroid vein (Latin: vena thyreoidea media) collects the blood from the lower portion of the thyroid gland. It receives tributaries that drain the larynx, and trachea. It passes anterior to the common carotid artery to reach and drain into the internal jugular vein.

== Anatomy ==
=== Fate ===
It empties into the internal jugular vein posterior to the superior belly of the omohyoid muscle.

== Clinical significance ==
This vein is subjected for dissection as a part of surgical procedures on the thyroid.

== Additional images ==
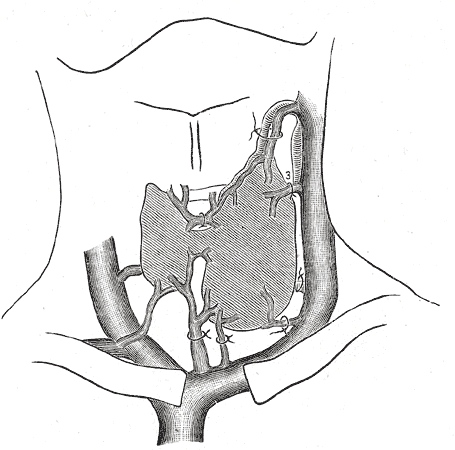
Diagram showing common arrangement of thyroid veins.

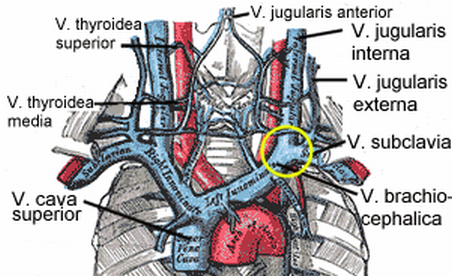
The venæ cavæ and azygos veins, with their tributaries.
