= Petrosal sinus =

Petrosal sinus may refer to:

- Inferior petrosal sinus
- Superior petrosal sinus
- Inferior petrosal sinus sampling
