= Abdominojugular test =

Physical examination test useful in diagnosing right ventricle dysfunction

- Synonyms: Abdominojugular reflux, hepatojugular reflux
- Purpose: Diagnosis of right ventricle dysfunction

The abdominojugular test, also known as abdominojugular reflux (AJR) or hepatojugular reflux test, is a physical examination test useful in diagnosing right ventricle dysfunction, particularly right ventricular failure.

AJR is a test for measuring jugular venous pressure (JVP) through the distention of the internal jugular vein. A positive AJR test correlates with the pulmonary artery pressure and thus is a marker for right heart dysfunction, specifically right ventricular failure.

Reflux in this context means backup of the circulatory system and is not to be confused with reflex.

== Procedure ==
The clinician presses firmly over either the right upper quadrant of the abdomen (i.e., over the liver) or over the center of the abdomen for 10 seconds with a pressure of 20 to 35 mm Hg while observing the swelling of the internal jugular vein in the neck and also observing to be sure the patient does not perform a Valsalva maneuver.

On an otherwise healthy individual, the jugular venous pressure remains constant or temporarily rises for a heartbeat or two, before returning to normal. This negative result would be indicated by a lack of swelling of the jugular vein. Negative abdominojugular reflux is seen in Budd-Chiari syndrome.

A positive result is variously defined as either a sustained rise in the JVP of at least 3 cm or more or a fall of 4 cm or more after the examiner releases pressure. The AJR has a reported sensitivity of 24% to 72% and a specificity of 93% to 96%. The large discrepancy in sensitivity may be explained by the higher value being reported during performance in optimal conditions of a cardiac lab while the lower value was from a study in an emergency department.
