= Laryngeal artery =

laryngeal artery may refer to

- Inferior laryngeal artery
- Superior laryngeal artery
