= Superior laryngeal vein =

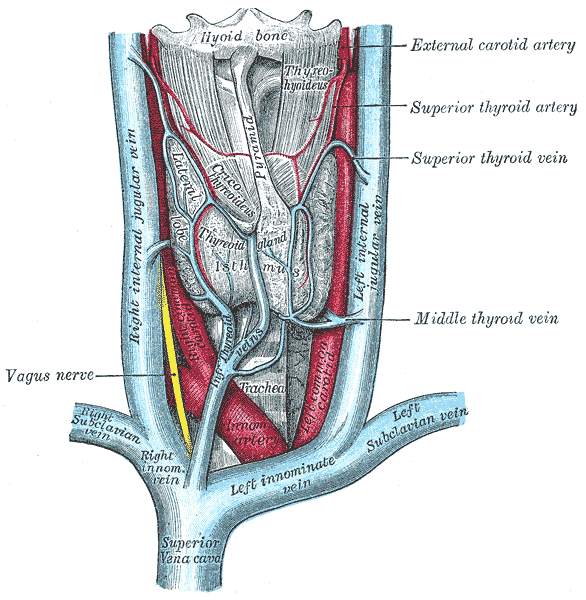
- Inferior thyroid veins visible at center

Details
- Drains from: Larynx
- Drains to: Superior thyroid vein
- Artery: Superior laryngeal artery

Identifiers
- Latin: vena laryngea superior
- TA98: A12.3.05.017
- TA2: 4813
- FMA: 14324

The superior laryngeal vein is a vein which drains the larynx into the superior thyroid vein.
