= Pharyngeal venous plexus =

Details

Identifiers
- Latin: plexus pharyngeus
- TA98: A12.3.05.006
- TA2: 4805
- FMA: 50822

The pharyngeal venous plexus is a venous plexus, a network of veins, beginning in the pharyngeal plexus on the outer surface of the pharynx, and, after receiving some posterior meningeal veins and the vein of the pterygoid canal, end in the internal jugular.

== See also ==
- Pterygoid venous plexus
