= Inferior thyroid veins =

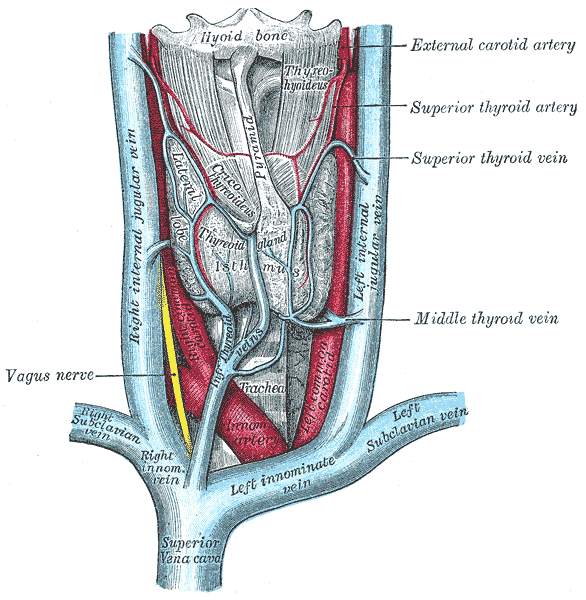
- Inferior thyroid veins visible at center

Details
- Drains from: Thyroid gland
- Drains to: Brachiocephalic vein
- Artery: Inferior thyroid artery

Identifiers
- Latin: venae thyreoideae inferiores
- TA98: A12.3.04.002
- TA2: 4795
- FMA: 4728

The inferior thyroid veins appear two, frequently three or four, in number, and arise in the venous plexus on the thyroid gland, communicating with the middle and superior thyroid veins. While the superior and middle thyroid veins serve as direct tributaries to the internal jugular vein, the inferior thyroid veins drain directly to the brachiocephalic veins.

The inferior thyroid veins form a plexus in front of the trachea, behind the sternothyroid muscle. From this plexus, the left vein descends and joins the left brachiocephalic vein, and the right vein passes obliquely downward and to the right across the brachiocephalic artery to open into the right brachiocephalic vein, just at its junction with the superior vena cava; sometimes the right and left veins open by a common trunk in the latter situation.

Occasionally, a fourth thyroid vein—known as Kocher’s vein—may be present, arising between the middle and inferior thyroid veins and draining into the internal jugular vein.

The inferior thyroid veins receive esophageal, tracheal, and inferior laryngeal veins, and are provided with valves at their terminations in the brachiocephalic veins.

== Additional images ==
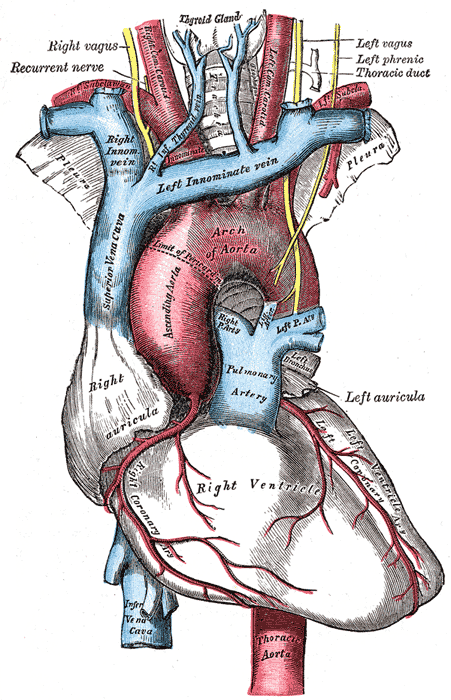
The arch of the aorta, and its branches.

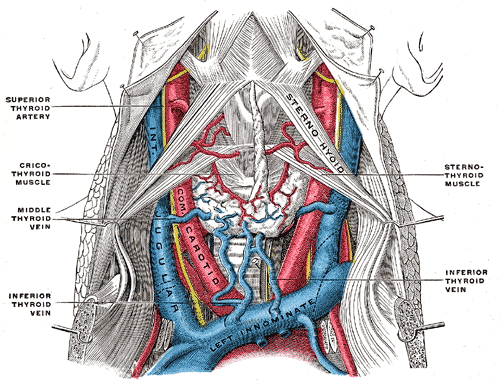
The fascia and middle thyroid veins.

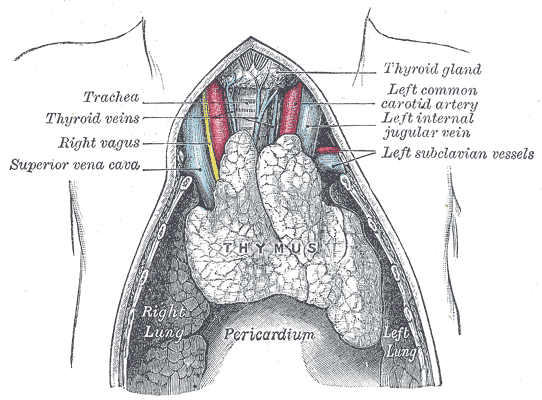
The thymus of a full-term fetus, exposed in situ.

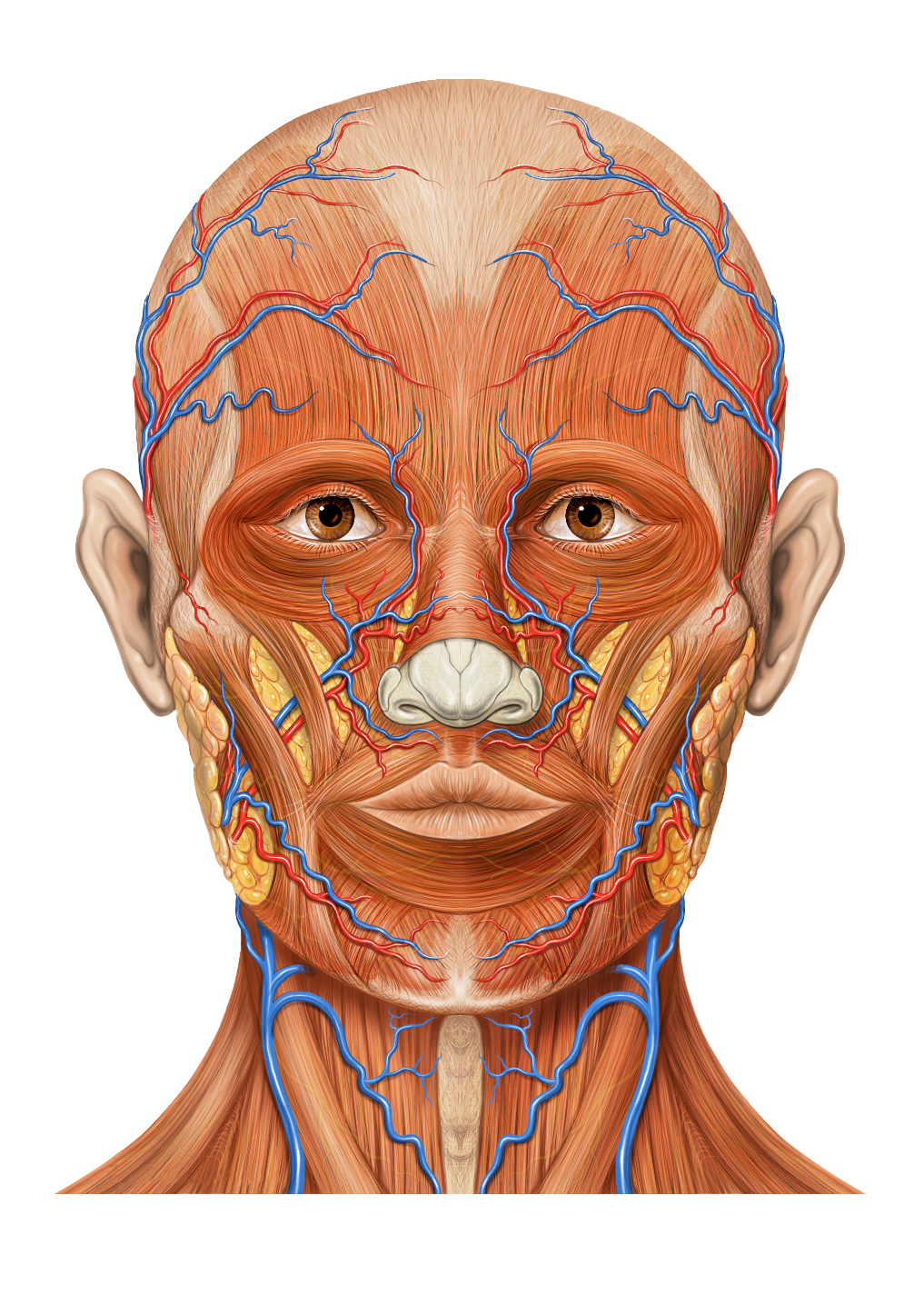
Head anatomy anterior view
