= Internal jugular vein =

Blood vessel that drains the head

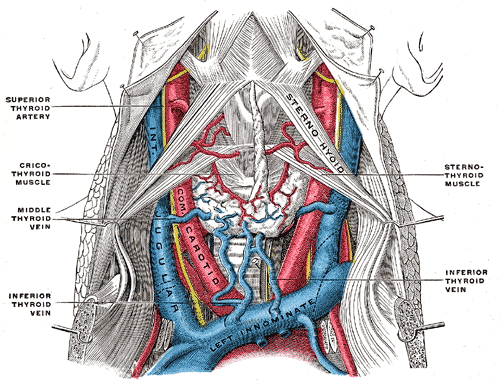
- The fascia and middle thyroid veins. (Internal jugular visible at center left.)

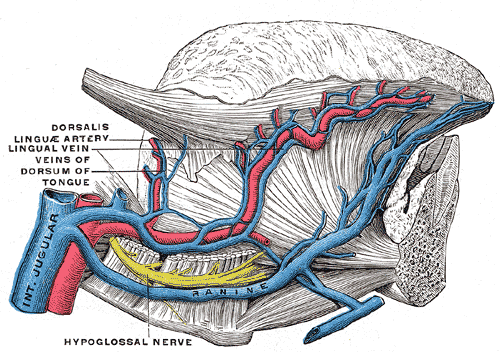
- Veins of the tongue. The hypoglossal nerve has been displaced downward in this preparation. (Internal jugular visible at bottom left.)

Details
- Drains from: Neck
- Source: Sigmoid sinus and inferior petrosal sinus
- Drains to: Brachiocephalic vein
- Artery: Internal carotid, common carotid

Identifiers
- Latin: vena jugularis interna
- TA98: A12.3.05.001
- TA2: 4800
- FMA: 4724

The internal jugular vein is a paired jugular vein that collects blood from the brain and the superficial parts of the face and neck. This vein runs in the carotid sheath with the common carotid artery and vagus nerve.

It begins in the posterior compartment of the jugular foramen, at the base of the skull. It is somewhat dilated at its origin, which is called the superior bulb.

This vein also has a common trunk into which drains the anterior branch of the retromandibular vein, the facial vein, and the lingual vein.

It runs down the side of the neck in a vertical direction, being at one end lateral to the internal carotid artery, and then lateral to the common carotid artery, and at the root of the neck, it unites with the subclavian vein to form the brachiocephalic vein (innominate vein); a little above its termination is a second dilation, the inferior bulb.

Above, it lies upon the rectus capitis lateralis, behind the internal carotid artery and the nerves passing through the jugular foramen. Lower down, the vein and artery lie upon the same plane, the glossopharyngeal and hypoglossal nerves passing forward between them. The vagus nerve descends between and behind the vein and the artery in the same sheath (the carotid sheath), and the accessory runs obliquely backward, superficial or deep to the vein.

At the root of the neck, the right internal jugular vein is a little distance from the common carotid artery, and crosses the first part of the subclavian artery, while the left internal jugular vein usually overlaps the common carotid artery.

The left vein is generally smaller than the right, and each contains a pair of valves, which exist about 2.5 cm above the termination of the vessel.

== Variation ==
In 9–12% of the Western population, the size, shape or course of the internal jugular vein is abnormal. Variants identified including veins markedly smaller, or not functionally present. The mean diameter is 10 mm, but may range between 5 and 35 mm.

== Tributaries ==
- Inferior petrosal sinus
- Pharyngeal vein
- Common facial vein
- Lingual vein
- Superior thyroid vein
- Middle thyroid vein
- Occipital vein (sometimes)

== Clinical relevance ==
The jugular veins are relatively superficial and not protected by tissues such as bone or cartilage. This makes them susceptible to damage. Due to the large volumes of blood that flow through the jugular veins, damage to the jugulars can quickly cause significant blood loss, which can lead to hypovolemic shock and then death if not treated.

=== Jugular venous pressure ===
As there is one pair of valves between the right atrium of the heart and the internal jugular, blood can flow back into the internal jugular when the pressure in the atrium is sufficiently high. This can be seen from the outside, and allows one to estimate the pressure in the atrium. The pulsation seen is called the jugular venous pressure, or JVP. This is normally viewed with the patient at 45 degrees turning his/her head slightly away from the observer. The JVP can be raised in a number of conditions:

- right ventricular failure (heart failure),
- tricuspid stenosis
- tricuspid regurgitation
- cardiac tamponade

The JVP can also be artificially raised by applying pressure to the liver (the hepatojugular reflux). This method is used to locate the JVP and distinguish it from the carotid pulse. Unlike the carotid pulse, the JVP is impalpable.

=== Catheterization ===
As the internal jugular is large, central and relatively superficial, it is often used to place central venous lines. Such a line may be inserted for several reasons, such as to accurately measure the central venous pressure or to administer fluids when a line in a peripheral vein would be unsuitable (such as during resuscitation when peripheral veins are hard to locate).

Because the internal jugular rarely varies in its location, it is easier to find than other veins. However, sometimes when a line is inserted the jugular is missed and other structures such as the carotid artery, lung or the vagus nerve (CN X) are punctured, and damage is caused to these structures.

== Additional images ==
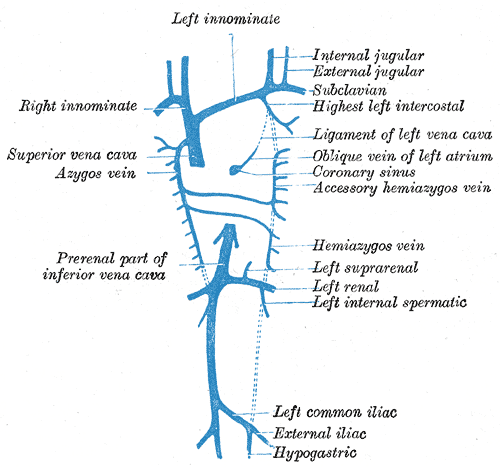
Diagram showing completion of development of the parietal veins.

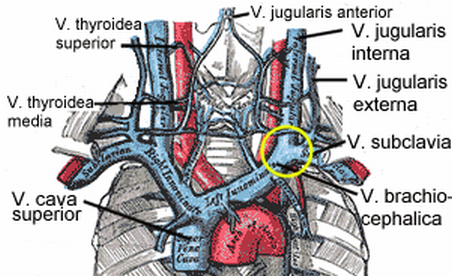
The venæ cavæ and azygos veins, with their tributaries.

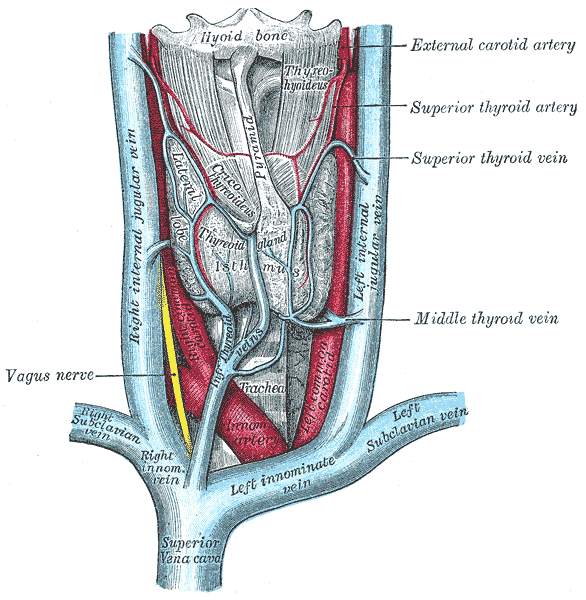
The thyroid gland and its relations.

== See also ==
- Jugular vein
