= Superior thyroid vein =

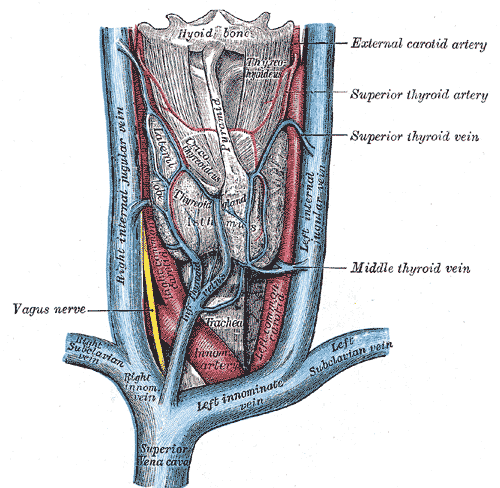
- The veins of the thyroid gland

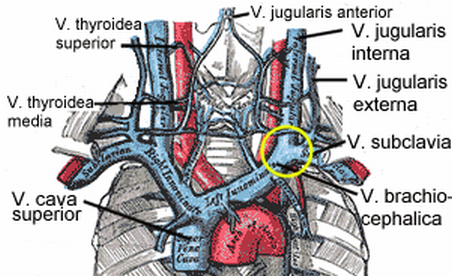
- Veins

Details
- Drains to: Internal jugular vein
- Artery: Superior thyroid artery

Identifiers
- Latin: vena thyreoidea superior
- TA98: A12.3.05.014
- TA2: 4812
- FMA: 14323

The superior thyroid vein is the vena comitans of the superior thyroid artery. It is formed by the union of deep and superficial tributaries that correspond to the arterial branches of the superior thyroid artery. Its tributaries are the superior laryngeal vein, and the cricothyroid veins. The vein empties into either the internal jugular vein, or the facial vein.

== Additional images ==
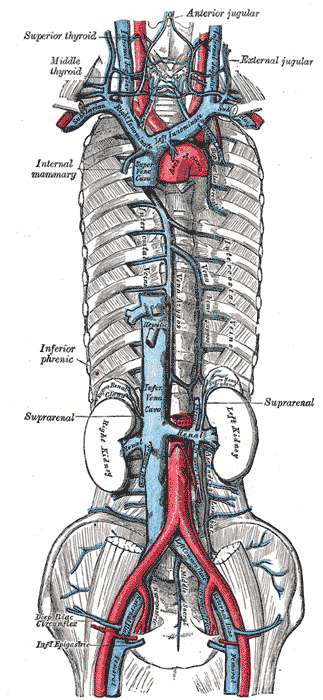
The venae cavae and azygos veins with their tributaries.

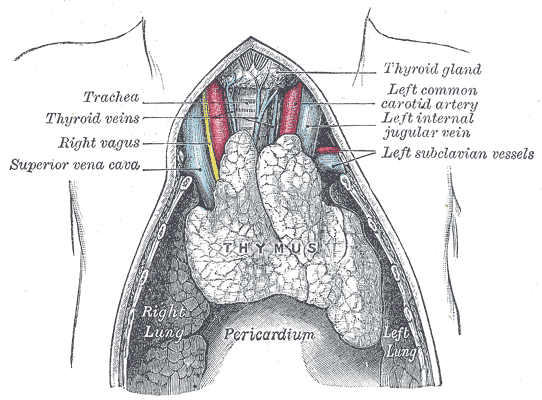
The thymus of a full-time fetus.
