= Crown (tooth part) =

Area of teeth covered by enamel

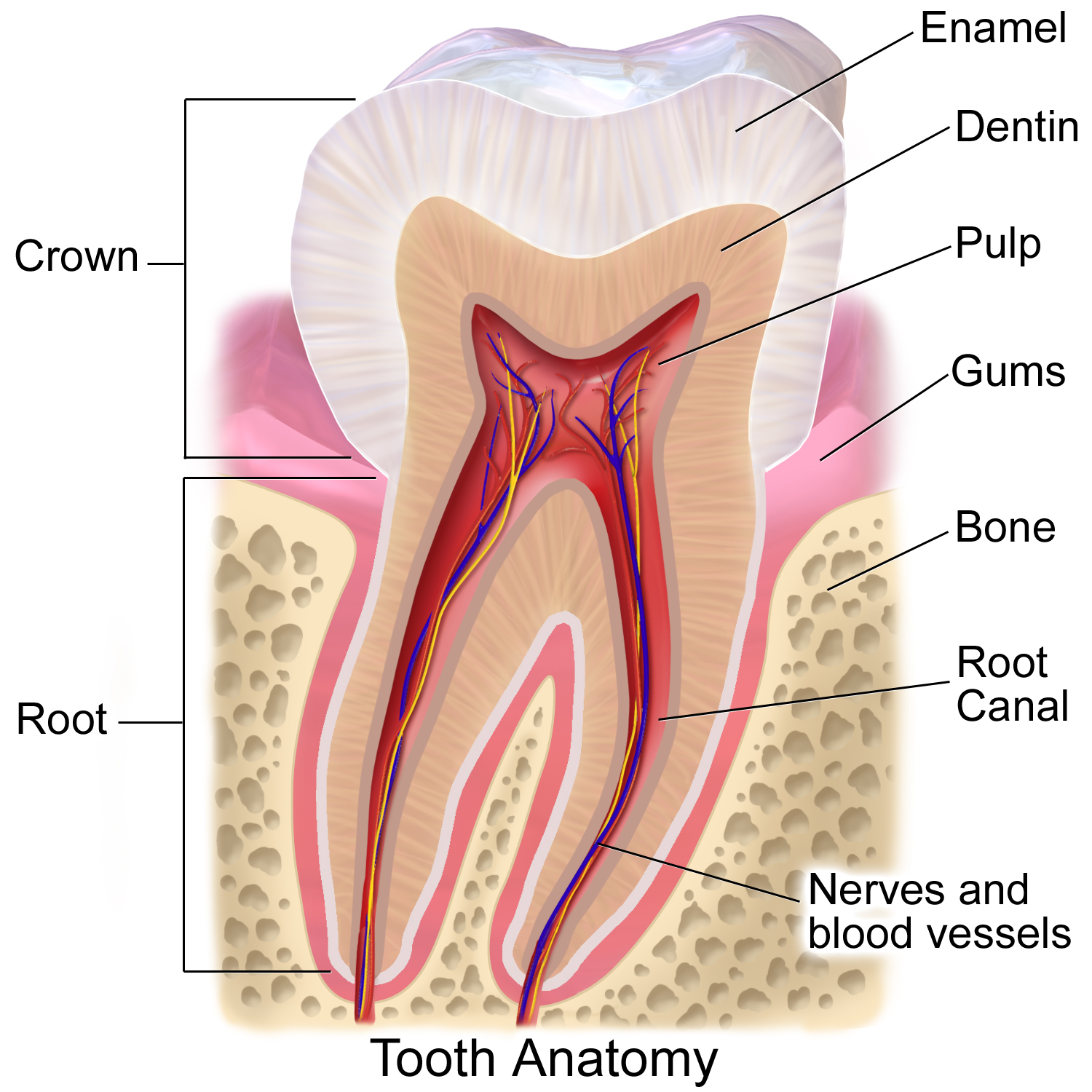
- Crown labeled at left in image

Details

Identifiers
- Latin: corona dentis
- MeSH: D019228
- TA98: A05.1.03.009
- TA2: 915
- FMA: 55623

1. Tooth 2. Enamel 3. Dentin 4. Dental pulp ::5. cameral pulp ::6. root pulp :7. Cementum :8. Crown ::9. Cusp ::10. Sulcus :11. Neck :12. Root ::13. Furcation ::14. Root apex :::15. Apical foramen 16. Gingival sulcus; 17. Periodontium; :18. Gingiva: ::19. free or interdental ::20. marginal ::21. alveolar :22. Periodontal ligament :23. Alveolar bone 24. Vessels and nerves: :25. dental :26. periodontal :27. alveolar through channel

In dentistry, the crown is the visible part of the tooth above the gingival margin and is an essential component of dental anatomy. Covered by enamel, the crown plays a crucial role in cutting, tearing, and grinding food. Its shape and structure vary depending on the type and function of the tooth (incisors, canines, premolars, or molars), and differ between primary dentition and permanent dentition. The crown also contributes to facial aesthetics, speech, and oral health.

== Anatomical crown vs clinical crown ==
The anatomical crown refers to the portion of the tooth covered by enamel, regardless of whether it is visible. The clinical crown is the part of the tooth that is visible in the mouth. In a healthy young adult, the gums typically follow the contour where enamel meets the root, so the clinical and anatomical crowns are similar in size. However, with age or periodontal disease, this may change.

== Terminology of tooth surfaces ==
To describe the location and orientation of the crown's surfaces, dental professionals use several standard terms.

The surface of the tooth that faces the lips or cheeks is referred to as the facial surface. In anterior teeth, such as incisors and canines, this surface is more specifically known as the labial surface, while in posterior teeth, such as premolars and molars, it is termed the buccal surface.

The lingual surface is the side of the tooth that faces the tongue. In the upper jaw or maxillary arch, this surface may also be referred to as the palatal surface due to its proximity to the palate.

The occlusal surface is the chewing surface found on posterior teeth (premolar and molars), whereas anterior teeth have an incisal edge, which is a sharp cutting edge used for biting.

The sides of a tooth that make contact with neighbouring teeth are called proximal surfaces. If the surface faces toward the midline of the dental arch, it is known as the mesial surface. Conversely, if it faces away from the midline, it is termed the distal surface.

== Function of the tooth crown ==
The crown contributes to multiple functions, including mastication, speech, aesthetics, and protection of supporting oral structures. Incisors, positioned at the front of the mouth, have sharp edges for cutting food and aiding in speech. Canines have pointed cusps to tear food and support the bite. Premolars combine tearing and grinding functions, while molars, with their broad surfaces, are specialised for crushing and grinding food.

== Structure of the anatomical crown ==
The anatomical crown refers to the portion of a tooth covered by enamel, it includes three main layers: enamel, dentine, and the pulp chamber.

=== Enamel ===
Enamel is the outermost and hardest tissue in the human body. It consists of approximately 96% inorganic material, primarily in the form of carbonated hydroxyapatite crystals, with the remainder composed of organic matrix and water. Its main function is to protect the underlying dentine and aid in food breakdown through mastication.

Enamel is formed during amelogenesis, a two-stage process beginning with the secretion of an organic matrix by ameloblasts near the dentinoenamel junction (DEJ). Once mineralisation reaches 96%, enamel formation is complete, and no further deposition occurs due to the degeneration of ameloblasts.

At the microscopic level, enamel has a complex structure composed of enamel rods and interrod enamel, arranged in a prism-like pattern which contributes to its density and mechanical strength.

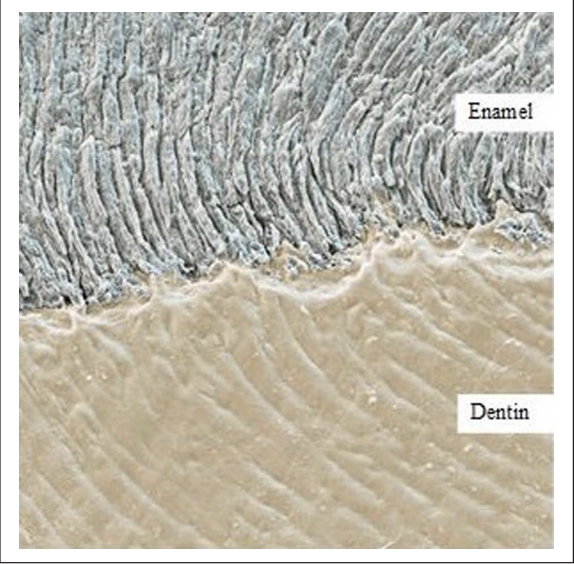
Figure 2: Rows of hydroxyapatite embedded in a protein matrix in enamel

=== Dentine ===
Dentine lies beneath the enamel and forms the bulk of the anatomical crown. It supports the enamel and protects the innermost pulp chamber. Composed of 70% inorganic material, 20% organic matrix (mainly collagen), and 10% water, dentine is resilient and capable of absorbing functional stresses.

The structure of dentine includes dentinal tubules that extend from the enamel-dentine junction to the pulp. These tubules are surrounded by peritubular and intertubular dentine, contributing to its mechanical properties and sensitivity.

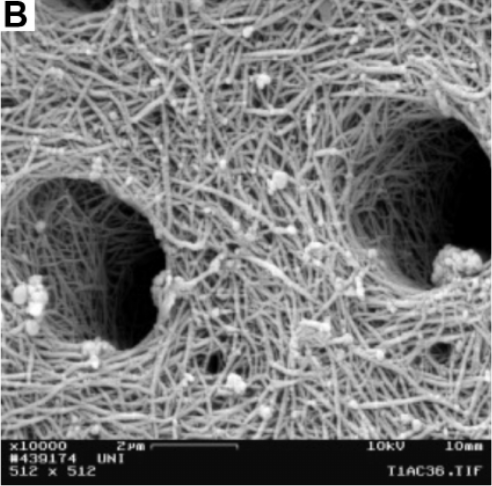
Figure 3: X1000 magnification of demineralised peri and intertubular dentine

=== Pulp chamber ===
The pulp chamber is the innermost part of the anatomical crown and contains blood vessels, nerves, lymphatics, and odontoblasts. It plays a role in dentine formation, nutrient delivery, and pain response.

Though mainly associated with root canal treatments, the pulp chamber's position within the crown is important in clinical practice. Several anatomical "laws" have been described to aid in locating the pulp chamber during restorative or endodontic procedures:

- Law of centrality: The pulp chamber is always located in the centre of the tooth at the level of the cementoenamel junction (CEJ).
- Law of concentricity: At the CEJ level, the pulp chamber walls are concentric to the external surface of the crown.
- Law of the CEJ: The CEJ is the most consistent landmark for locating the pulp chamber.

== Differences between primary and permanent crowns ==
Figure 4: Image depicting primary dentition

Primary teeth are the first set of teeth in the human dentition. It comprises 20 teeth, known as primary teeth or milk teeth. Primary teeth begin to erupt in infancy and are eventually replaced by permanent teeth. Premature loss of primary teeth can result in malocclusion or crowding of the permanent successors.

Primary teeth differ from permanent teeth in several anatomical and structural ways. The crowns of primary teeth are generally shorter and broader, with a thinner layer of enamel, making them more susceptible to wear. This enamel also gives them a whiter appearance compared to permanent teeth. In anterior teeth, mamelons, small bumps on the incisal edge of newly erupted permanent incisors, are absent in the primary dentition. The cervical ridges are more pronounced, particularly in molars, and the crowns are more bulbous with a distinct cervical constriction.

Structurally, the roots of primary teeth are thinner and more widely spread, with short or absent root trunks. These adaptations facilitate natural exfoliation as the underlying permanent teeth erupt.

Functionally and morphologically, primary molars have narrower occlusal tables and flatter buccal and lingual surfaces, whereas anterior primary teeth are proportionally wider mesiodistally compared to their crown height. These distinctions are important during dental assessments and restorative procedures.

== Morphological variation across tooth types ==
=== Incisors ===
In the permanent dentition, maxillary central incisors have broad, rectangular crowns with a straight incisal edge. Newly erupted incisors often display three mamelons, which wear down with time. The lingual surface contains a distinct cingulum bordered by mesial distal marginal ridges, enclosing a shallow lingual fossa. Maxillary lateral incisors are smaller, with rounded incisal angles and a deeper lingual fossa that may include developmental grooves. Mandibular central incisors are the smallest teeth and exhibit a symmetrical crown with a straight incisal edge and smooth lingual surface. Mandibular lateral incisors are slightly larger and possess a distally sloping incisal edge.

Primary maxillary central incisors have crowns wider mesiodistally than inciso-cervically, a feature not found in any other tooth. They lack mamelons and display a prominent cingulum and marginal ridges with a deeper lingual fossa. Primary lateral incisors are smaller with more rounded incisal angles. In the mandible, primary central incisors are symmetrical with a tapered crown and smooth lingual surface, while lateral incisors are slightly larger with a distally sloped incisal edge.

=== Canines ===
Permanent maxillary canines are characterised by a prominent labial ridge, a well-developed cingulum, and a pronounced pointed cusp. The crown appears diamond-shaped from the incisal view, with strong mesial and distal slopes. The lingual anatomy includes a central ridge flanked by shallow fossae and prominent marginal ridges. Mandibular canines are narrower mesiodistally, with a less prominent cingulum and smoother lingual surface. Their crowns are generally flatter and less pointed than those of maxillary canines.

In the primary dentition, maxillary canines maxillary canines have prominent, sharp cusps with longer mesial slopes. The crown is constricted cervically and appears more bulbous.

=== Premolars ===
Maxillary premolars usually have two cusps–buccal and lingual. The first premolars show sharp buccal cusp and a smaller lingual cusp separated by a central groove. They often exhibit a pronounced buccal ridge and occlusal sulcus. The second premolars are smaller with cusps of more equal height and display more supplemental grooves on the occlusal surface.

Mandibular first premolars have a dominant buccal cusp and a much smaller lingual cusp, often giving the appearance of a single cusp. The crown tapers sharply towards the lingual side. Second premolars typically have two lingual cusps and a broader, square, or round occlusal table. Their occlusal groove pattern may vary from Y, H, to U shapes.

=== Molars ===
Maxillary first permanent molars have four main cusps, and sometimes a fifth cusp known as the cusp of Carabelli. The occlusal surface typically has a rhomboidal shape and includes a distinct oblique ridge connecting the mesiopalatal and distobuccal cusps. Second maxillary molars are smaller, and the distopalatal cusp may be reduced or absent, giving rise to a heart-shaped occlusal form. Third molars are highly variable in anatomy, often smaller and more rounded, with numerous accessory grooves and ridges.

Mandibular first molars have five cusps and a pentagonal occlusal outline. They include three buccal and two lingual cusps, separated by distinct grooves. The mesiobuccal cusp is typically the largest. Second molars have four cusps of nearly equal size and a rectangular occlusal outline, with grooves forming a cross pattern. Third molars exhibit significant anatomical variation and often have wrinkled occlusal surfaces due to supplemental grooves.

Primary molars differ in shape and size from permanent molars. Maxillary first molars have a prominent mesiopalatal cusp and a smooth buccal surface with minimal grooves. Second molars resemble permanent maxillary first molars and include a cusp of Carabelli. Mandibular first molars are unique in shape and do not resemble any permanent teeth, featuring a strong mesial marginal ridge and pronounced curvature at the cervical third. Second mandibular molars resemble the permanent mandibular first molars but are smaller in all dimensions.

=== Radiographic appearance ===
On radiographs, enamel appears as the most radiopaque (white) structure due to its high mineral content. Dentine and cementum are less radiopaque and are usually indistinguishable from each other. The pulp chamber and root canals are radiolucent (dark), centrally located within the tooth structure. The periodontal ligament appears as a thin, radiolucent line between the root and the lamina dura.

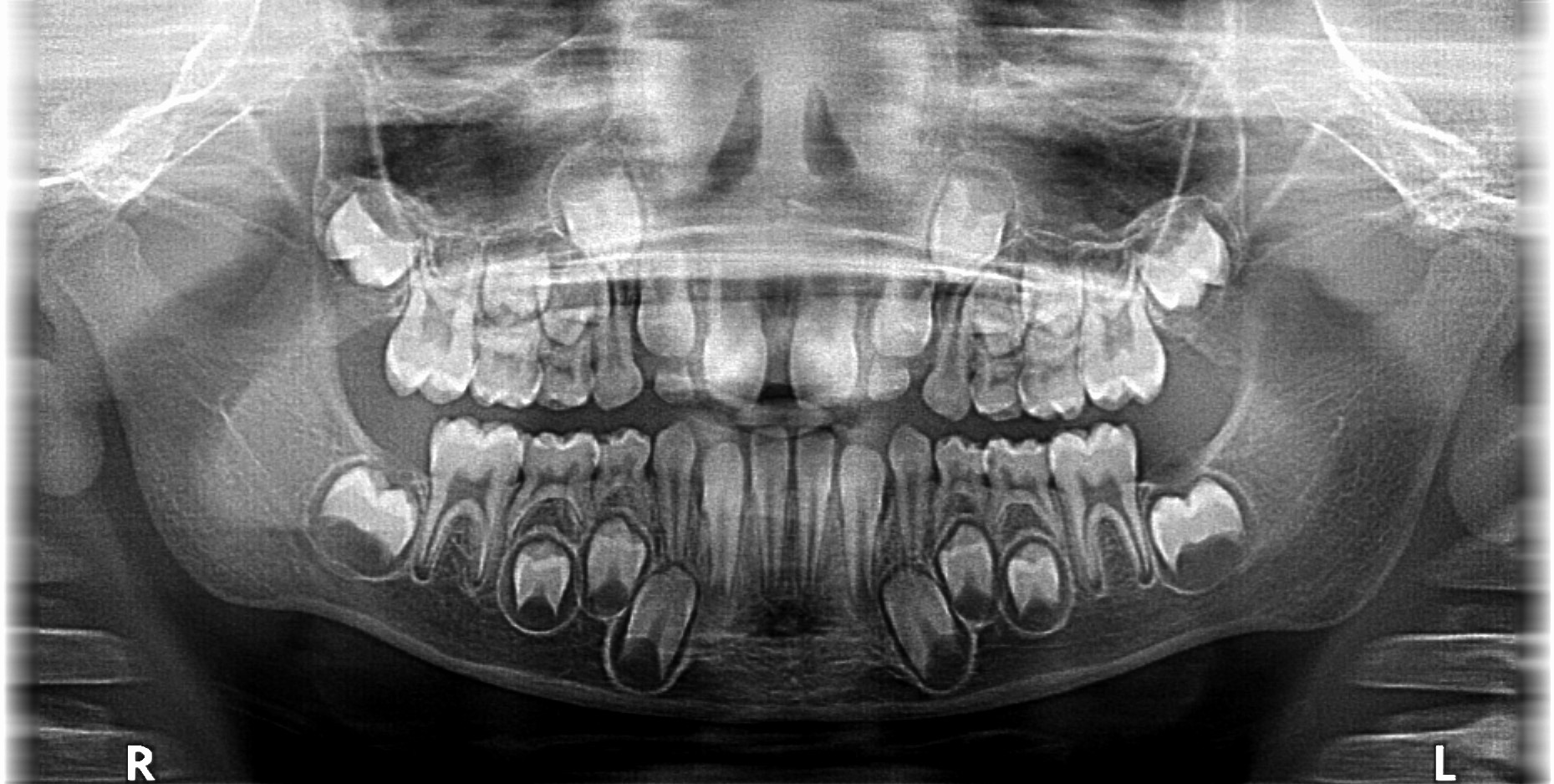
Figure 5: X-ray showing mixed primary and permanent teeth of an eight-year-old boy

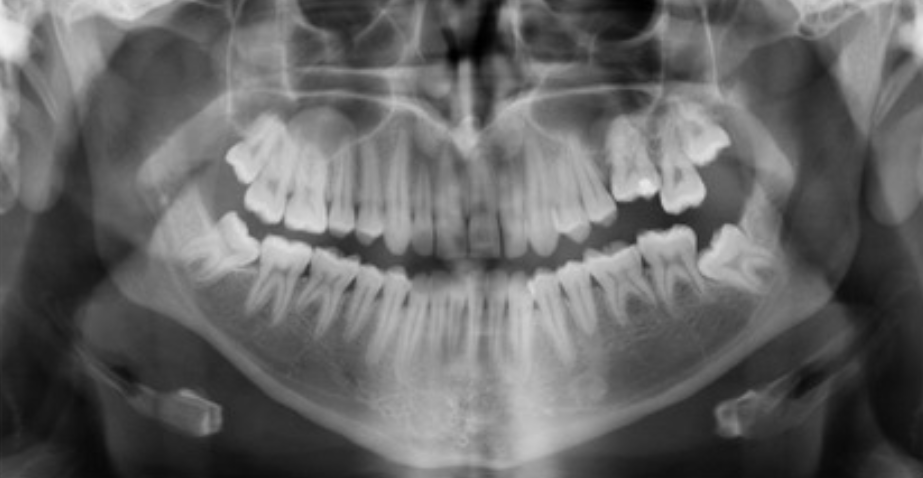
Figure 6: X-ray showing permanent dentition

== Developmental anomalies affecting crown shape ==
Developmental anomalies that affect the crown of a tooth can lead to changes in its shape, size, and structure, affecting both appearance and function. These anomalies typically arise during the early stages of tooth formation, and can result in irregularities such as extra cusps, fused teeth, or abnormal indentations. Such variations in crown morphology can cause difficulties in maintaining oral hygiene, occlusal issues, and increase the risk of caries and periodontal problems.

=== Fusion ===
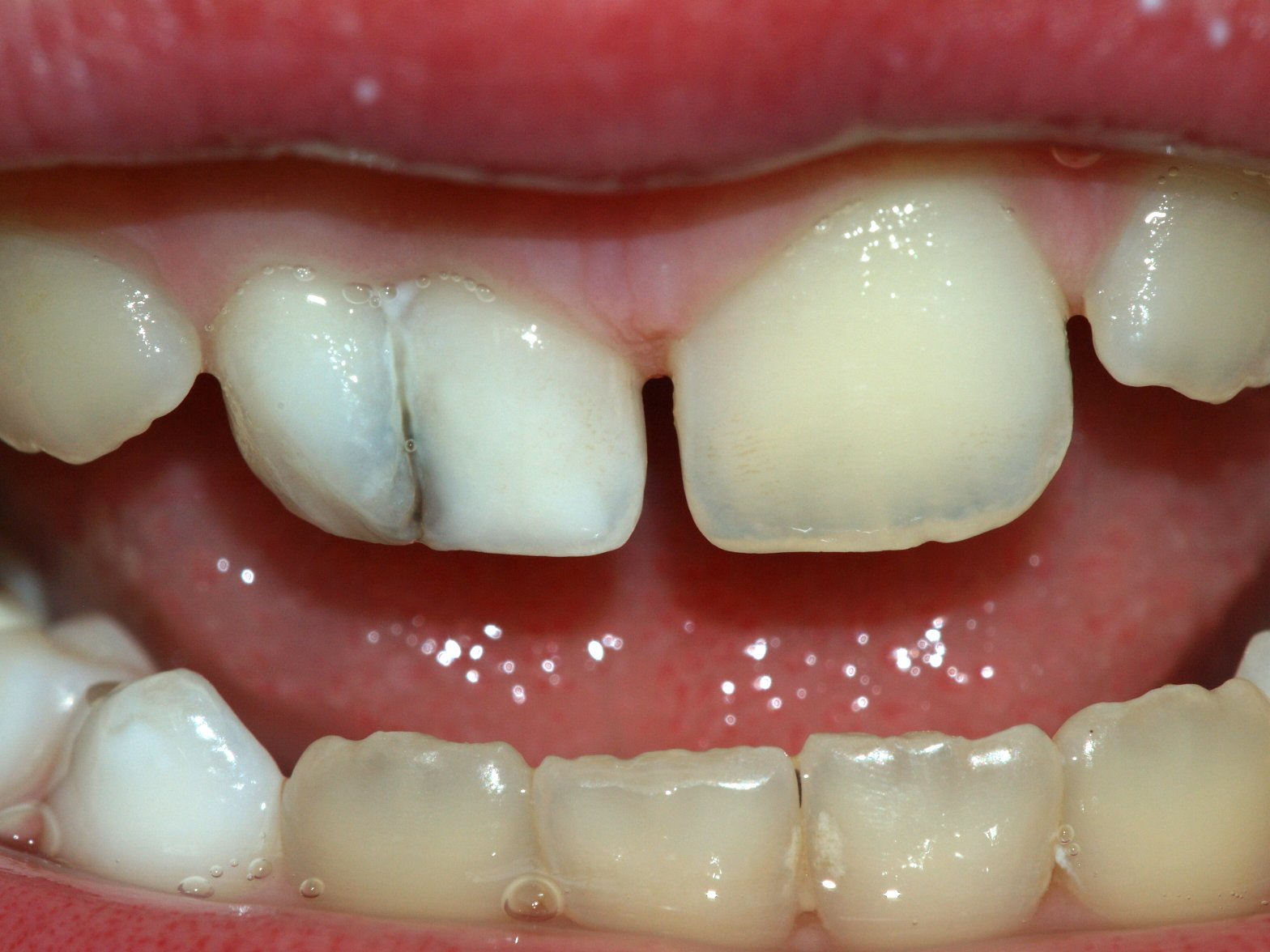
Figure 7: Fusion of crowns

Fusion occurs when two developing teeth merge, forming a large crown that may have one or two roots. Complete fusion affects both crown and roots, while incomplete fusion affects only the crown. The crown may have a groove or notch that increases plaque retention. Management includes sealants, reshaping, or extraction if necessary.

=== Gemination ===
Gemination results from a single tooth attempting to divide. It presents as a bifid crown with a single root and root canal. Unlike fusion, gemination does not reduce tooth count. Deep grooves increase caries risk. Treatment may include sealants, restorations, or orthodontic correction.

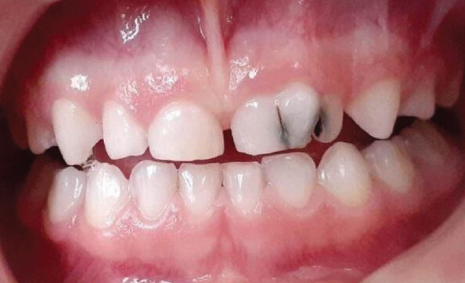
Figure 8: Carious enlarged crown of a geminated primary upper left central incisor

Clinically, geminated teeth can cause aesthetic concerns, spacing issues, and malocclusion. Depending on its impact, treatment may include sealants, restorations, orthodontic correction, or extraction in severe cases.

=== Dens invaginatus (dens in dente) ===
Dens invaginatus (DI), or dens in dente, is a condition where part of the tooth crown folds inward before hardening, during development, forming a deep groove or pocket lined with enamel. This anomaly most commonly affects upper lateral incisors, followed by central incisors, and premolars.

Oehlers (1957) classified DI into three types based on how far the invagination extends within the tooth:

- Type I: The invagination is limited to the crown and does not reach the root.
- Type II: The invagination extends into the root but remains within the pulp chamber, without any communication with the periodontium.
- Type III: The invagination extends from the crown through the root, forming an opening into the periodontal ligament either laterally (Type IIIa) or at the root apex (IIIb).

Only Type I and Type III directly affect the crown, altering its shape and surface features.

Affected teeth may appear barrel-shaped or conical and are prone to caries. Treatment ranges from sealing to extraction, depending on severity.

=== Dens evaginatus ===
Dens evaginatus presents as an extra cusp on the occlusal or palatal surface, also known as talon cusp in anterior teeth. It contains enamel, dentine, and sometimes pulp. It may interfere with occlusion and increase caries risk. Management includes grinding, sealing, or root canal therapy if pulp is exposed.

=== Microdontia ===
Microdontia is a developmental anomaly where one or more teeth appear smaller than normal, often leading to aesthetic concerns, spacing issues, and difficulty chewing. The most commonly affected teeth are upper lateral incisors, often presenting as peg-shaped teeth with a conical appearance. Therefore, microdontia may contribute to functional issues such as food trapping due to improper spacing, leading to caries and periodontal issues. Management may include orthodontics and restorations.

=== Macrodontia ===
Macrodontia, or megalodontia, is a condition where one or more teeth are abnormally large, while still having normal crown, root, and pulp morphology. Isolated macrodontia usually occurs in isolation, but generalised macrodontia (affecting all teeth) may be linked to systemic conditions such as otodental syndrome, insulin-resistant diabetes, and hypophyseal gigantism. Not to be mistaken for gemination or fusion, macrodontia does not involve tooth splitting or merging. Clinically, macrodontia may cause crowding, misalignment, and aesthetic concerns. Treatment may include size reduction, orthodontics, or extraction.
