= Talon cusp =

Rare dental anomaly resulting in teeth having more than one cusp

- Other names: Eagle's talon, dens evaginatus, interstitial cusp, tuberculated premolar, evaginated odontoma, supernumerary cusp
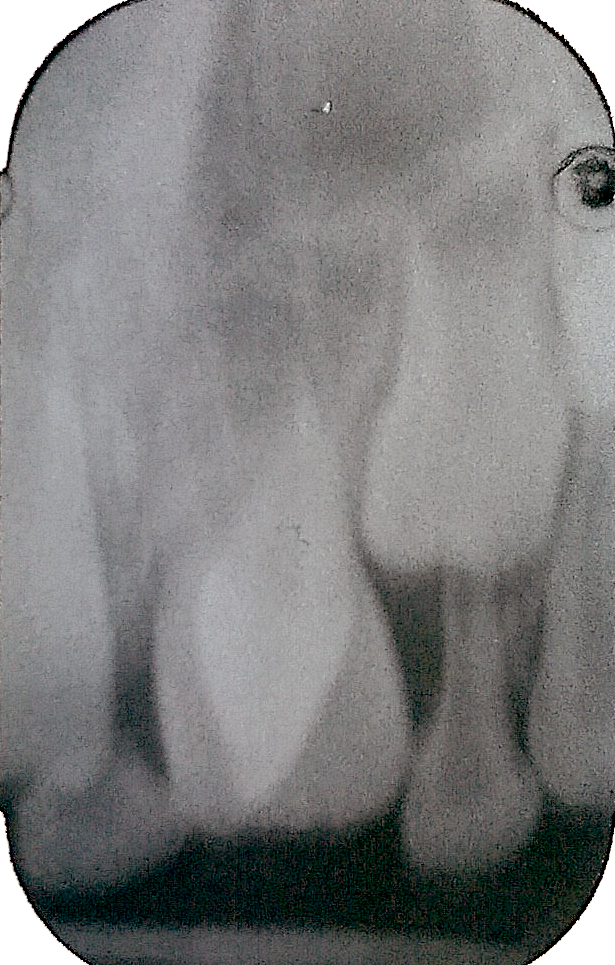
- Periapical radiograph of talon cusp on a partially erupted upper left permanent maxillary incisor in an 8-year-old male of Arabic descent
- Specialty: Dentistry

Talon cusp is a rare dental anomaly resulting in an extra cusp or cusp-like projection on an anterior tooth, located on the inside surface of the affected tooth. Sometimes it can also be found on the facial surface of the anterior tooth.

The term 'talon cusp' refers to the same condition as dens evaginatus; however, talon cusp is more specifically the manifestation of dens evaginatus on the anterior teeth. Talon cusp can be simply defined as hyperplasia of the cingulum of an anterior tooth.

Although talon cusp may not appear serious, and in some people may be completely benign, it can cause clinical, diagnostic and functional problems, and alters the appearance of a person's teeth. The condition was first described by W.H. Mitchell in 1982 and named by J. Kimball Mellor B.S., D.D.S. and Louis W. Ripa, D.D.S., M.S. due to its similar appearance to an eagle's talon. Some sources define a talon cusp as an extra cusp which extends at least half the distance between the cementoenamel junction and the incisal edge of the tooth. Other sources classify all enlarged cingula as talon cusps, and classify them according to the degree of enlargement.

The incidence of talon cusp has been found to range from 1% to 6% of the population. Talon cusp tends to occur on permanent teeth only, being very rare in deciduous teeth. In most cases, the involved teeth are the permanent maxillary lateral incisors (55%), followed by maxillary central incisors (33%), mandibular incisors (6%), and maxillary canines (4%).

== Signs and symptoms ==
Talon cusp will show physical signs of the irregular dental formation of the teeth and cause other symptoms of the disease that could possibly lead to dental problems in the future, depending on severity of the deformity.

Most commonly, the extra cusp is located on the lingual surface, giving a three-pronged appearance. Rarely, however, the extra cusp may be situated on the facial surface, or there may be extra cusps on both lingual and facial surfaces. There may be a deep groove between the talon cusp and the rest of the tooth. The extra cusp typically contains pulp tissue. When viewing talon cusp from the occlusal, the projection will appear "x-shaped", as well as appears conical, and mimic the shape of an eagle's talon.

Symptoms of talon cusp include:

- Interference with occlusion or bite
- Irritation of soft tissues and tongue
- Accidental cusp fracture
- Susceptible to dental caries

== Cause ==
The cause of talon cusp is unknown. The anomaly can occur due to genetic and environmental factors but the onset can be spontaneous. Prevention is difficult because the occurrence happens during the development of teeth.

Talon cusp affects men and women equally; however, the majority of reported cases are of the male gender. Individuals of Asian, Arabic, Native American and Inuit descent are affected more commonly. Talon cusp is also highly observed in patients with orofacial digital II syndrome and Rubinstein Taybi syndrome. Other anomalies that occur with talon cusp can include peg laterals, supernumerary teeth, dens envaginatus, agenesis and impaction. A person belonging to one of these particular demographics or one who has any of these deformities or syndromes may have a higher risk of having a talon cusp.

== Mechanism ==
The exact mechanism of the formation of dens evaginatus and talon cusp is unknown. It has been suggested that the anomaly is caused by an evagination. The formation of the "cusp" is due to excess layering of the internal enamel epithelium and dental papilla into the stellate reticulum. This occurs during the morphological differentiation stage of tooth development. During the developmental stages of tooth formation, certain dental follicle cells were differentiated incorrectly which formed the excess enamel and incorrect morphology of the affected tooth.

Talon cusp can progress into severe dental problems if the severity of the cusp affects the person's hygiene and oral functions.

Talon cusp may occur on its own or associated with other dental anomalies such as mesiodens, odontome, unerupted or impacted teeth, peg-shaped maxillary incisor, dens invaginatus, cleft lip, bilateral gemination, fusion, and supernumerary teeth.

== Diagnosis ==
This anomaly is large enough to be seen with the naked eye. One can see the projection on the incisal edge of a tooth looking into the mouth of the affected person. The structure is described to be "T-shaped" or "X-shaped" however will differ depending on its shape, size, structure, location and site of origin. X-rays and radiographs can also show evidence of the abnormality. The digital images would show a tooth with talon cusp as if it were "double teeth".

When looking at a radiograph some features to look for would be location, edge, shape and number. The location would be on an anterior tooth, the edge would be clear and well defined and can be seen even by the naked eye, and the shape would appear "talon-like" over the top portion or crown of the affected tooth. There could potentially be one, two or multiple protrusions depending on the type of cusp.

Talon cusp can fall under three categories: Type I, Type II and Type III. They are created based on the cusp formation shape and length of extension.

- Type I – Talon: The additional cusp or talon projects from the palatal surface of a primary or permanent anterior (front) tooth that extends at least half of the distance from the cemento enamel junction to the incisal edge.
- Type II – Semi Talon: The semi talon cusp measures about 1mm or more in length but extends less than half of the distance seen in Type I Talon.
- Type III – Trace Talon: The projection originates from the cingulum (also known as the "cervical third") of the root and is enlarged or prominent in any form (conical, bifid or tubercle-like)

Since many cases of Talon cusp go unreported, it is hard to draw linkage maps but it is safe to assume that dental formation is influenced by genetic factors. Talon cusp is also seen in association with conditions such as Rubinstein–Taybi syndrome, Mohr syndrome, Ellis–Van Creveld syndrome, Incontinentia pigmenti achromians, Berardinelli–Seip syndrome, and Sturge–Weber syndrome.

== Treatment ==
Treatment is only required if the occlusion or bite of the person is compromised and causing other dental problems. Multiple long-term clinical problems can arise such as occlusal interferences, aesthetic disturbances, loss of pulp vitality, irritation of tongue during mastication and speech, caries and displacement of the affected tooth. Most people with talon cusp will live their normal lives unless the case is severe and causes a cascade of other dental issues that lead to additional health problems. Generally talon cusps on lower teeth require no treatment, but talon cusps on upper teeth may interfere with the bite mechanics and may need to be removed or reduced.

Small talon cusps that produce no symptoms or complication for a person can remain untreated. However large talon cusps should not.

Some common treatments include:

- Fissure sealing
- Composite resin restoration
- Reduction of cusp
- Pulpotomy
- Root canal (endodontic treatment)
- Extraction

The condition is usually benign, but it can cause mild irritation to soft tissues around the teeth and the tongue, and if large enough, may pose an aesthetic problem. Talon cusps that are too large are filed down with a motorized file, and then endodontic therapy is administered.

In order to prevent any future dental complications, when talon cusp is present due to an early diagnosis it would be best to see a dentist regularly every six months for routine dental checkups, remain under observation, brush and floss properly and undergo regular topical applications of fluoride gel to prevent caries and to promote enamel strength.

== Recent research ==
Future studies will look further into the relationship of talon cusp and Rubinstein-Taybi syndrome and other oral-facial-digital syndromes. A former study showed a direct correlation in which 45 affected patients with Rubinstein-Taybi syndrome, 92% of these patients had talon cusp. Other researchers are attempting to trace talon cusp to ancestors and comparing dentition to modern humans. Another study done in 2007 examined the dentition of 301 Native American Indian skeletons for the presence or absence of talon cusp. The results showed five skeletons (2 percent) in the population had the trait.

In 2011, only 21 cases of talon cusp have been reported and are in literature. It appears that as of 2014 and 2015, additional research continues in hopes of finding the cause and mechanism of talon cusp. With the majority of cases of talon cusp being unreported, it remains difficult to conduct tests, come up with conclusions, conduct surgery and perform research with small numbers.
