= Dens evaginatus =

- Other names: Tuberculated cusp, accessory tubercle, occlusal tuberculated premolar, Leong's premolar, evaginatus odontoma, occlusal pearl
- Specialty: Dentistry

Dens evaginatus is a rare odontogenic developmental anomaly that is found in teeth where the outer surface appears to form an extra bump or cusp.

Premolars are more likely to be affected than any other tooth. It could occur unilaterally or bilaterally. Dens evaginatus (DE) typically occurs bilaterally and symmetrically. This may be seen more frequently in Asians (including Chinese, Malay, Thai, Japanese, Filipino and Indian populations).

The prevalence of DE ranges from 0.06% to 7.7% depending on the race. It is more common in men than in women, more frequent in the mandibular teeth than the maxillary teeth. Patients with Ellis-van Creveld syndrome, incontinentia pigmenti achromians, Mohr syndrome, Rubinstein-Taybi syndrome and Sturge Weber syndrome are at a higher risk of having DE.

== Signs and symptoms ==
It is important to diagnose DE early and provide appropriate treatment to help prevent periodontal disease, caries, pulpal complications and malocclusion. It occurs on the cingulum/occlusal surface of the teeth. The extra cusp can cause occlusal interference, displace of the affected tooth and/or opposing teeth, irritates the tongue when speaking and eating and decay the developmental grooves. Temporomandibular joint pain could be experienced secondarily due to occlusal trauma caused by the tubercle.

This cusp could be worn away or fractured easily. In 70% of the cases, the fine pulpal extension were exposed which can lead to infection, pulpal necrosis and periapical pathosis.

=== Associated anomalies ===
- Additional tubercules
- Aesthetic and/or occlusion problems
- Agenesis
- Bifid cingula
- Exaggerated cusp of Carabelli
- Gemination
- Impaction
- Labial drifting
- Labial groove
- Mesiodens
- Megadont
- Odontoma
- Peg-shaped lateral incisor
- Prominent marginal ridge
- Shallow groove in the lateral incisor
- Shovel-shaped incisor
- Supernumerary

== Cause ==
The cause of DE is still unclear. There is literature indicating that DE is an isolated anomaly. During the bell stage of tooth formation, DE may occur as a result of an unusual growth and folding of the inner enamel epithelium and ectomesenchymal cells of dental papilla into the stellate reticulum of the enamel organ.

== Diagnosis ==
Diagnosis of DE can be difficult when there is no signs and symptoms of necrotic or infected pulp. It is a challenging task to differentiate between a true periapical lesion and a normal periapical radiolucency of a dental follicle of an immature apex.

- Pulp tests (test results of immature teeth can be misleading, as they are known to give unreliable results)
- Check and see if there is an elevated, flat wear facet on the occlusal surface of the tooth
- Test cavity which has an absence of pain sensation and has an empty pulp chamber/ canal.
- Radiographs (usually periapical) - a V-shaped radiopaque structure could be seen superimposing on top of the affected crown. It could detect DE before tooth eruption. However, DE presentation on the radiograph can be quite similar to a mesiodens or a compound odontoma.

=== Classification ===
The anterior DE tubercles have an average width of 3.5 mm and length of 6.0 mm, while posterior tubercles have an average 2.0 mm in width and length of up to 3.5 mm. If the cusp of Carabelli is present, the tooth associated are often larger mesiodistally and it is not uncommon that a DE involved tooth has an abnormal root pattern.

There are 4 different ways to classify/ categorize DE involved teeth.

1. Schulge (1987) classification, teeth falls into 5 categories according to the location of the tubercles
  - Tubercle on the inclined plane of the lingual cusp
  - Cone-like enlargement of the buccal cusp
  - Tubercle on the inclined plane of the buccal cusp
  - Tubercle arising from the occlusal surface obliterating the central groove
2. Lau's classification, divide teeth into groups according to their anatomical shape
  - Smooth
  - Grooved
  - Terraced
  - Ridged
3. Oehlers classification, teeth categorized depending on the pulp contents within the tubercle (histological appearance of the pulps were examined)
  - Wide pulp horns (34%)
  - Narrow pulp horns (22%)
  - Constricted pulp horns (14%)
  - Isolated pulp horn remnants (20%)
  - No pulp horn (10%)
4. Hattab et al. classification
  - Anterior teeth
    - Type 1 - Talon, a well defined additional cusp that projects palatally and extends at least half the distance from the cementoenamel junction (CEJ) to the incisal edge
    - Type 2 - Semitalon, an additional cusp that extends less than half the distance from the CEJ to the incisal edge
    - Type 3 - Trace talon, prominent cingula
  - Posterior teeth
    - Occlusal DE
    - Buccal DE
    - Palatal DE/ Lingual DE

== Management ==
If the tooth involved is asymptomatic or small, no treatment is needed and a preventative approach should be taken.

Preventative measures include:

- Oral hygiene instruction
- Scaling and polishing
- Application of topical fluoride on reduced cusp
- Application of fissure sealant
- Frequent dental check-up, pay extra attention to fissures
- Perform direct or indirect pulp capping in cases with pulpal extension, to try increase the rate of reparative dentin formation (but may result in obliteration of the canal)
- Seal exposed dentin with microhybrid acid-etched flowable light-cured resin
- Perform pulpotomy with MTA using a modified Cvek technique

For teeth with normal pulp and mature apex, reduce the opposing occluding tooth. Reinforce the tubercle by applying flowable composite. Occlusion, restoration, pulp and periapex assessment should be done yearly. When there is adequate pulp recession, tubercle can be removed and tooth can be restored.

For teeth with normal pulp and immature apex, reduce the opposing occluding tooth. Apply flowable composite to the tubercle. Occlusion, restoration, pulp and periapex assessment should be done every 3-4 months until the apex matures. When there are signs of adequate pulp recession, tubercle can be removed and tooth can be restored.

For teeth with inflamed pulp and mature apex, conventional root canal treatment could be carried out and restored accordingly.

For teeth with inflamed pulp and immature apex, shallow MTA pulpotomy could be performed and then restore with glass ionomer and composite.

For teeth with necrotic pulp and mature apex, conventional root canal therapy could be done and restored.

For teeth with necrotic pulp and immature apex, MTA root-end barrier could be carried out. Glass ionomer layer and composite could be used to restore the tooth.

If there is occlusal interference, the opposing projection should be reduced. Make sure that the tubercle does not contact other teeth in all excursive movement. This is usually done over a few appointments, 6 to 8 weeks apart to allow the formation of reparative dentin to protect the pulp. Fluoride varnish should be applied onto the ground surface. Recall the patient for follow-up after 3, 6 and 12 months.

In some cases, extraction could be considered (e.g. for orthodontic purposes, failed apexification)
