= Cusp (anatomy) =

Pointed, projecting, or elevated anatomical feature

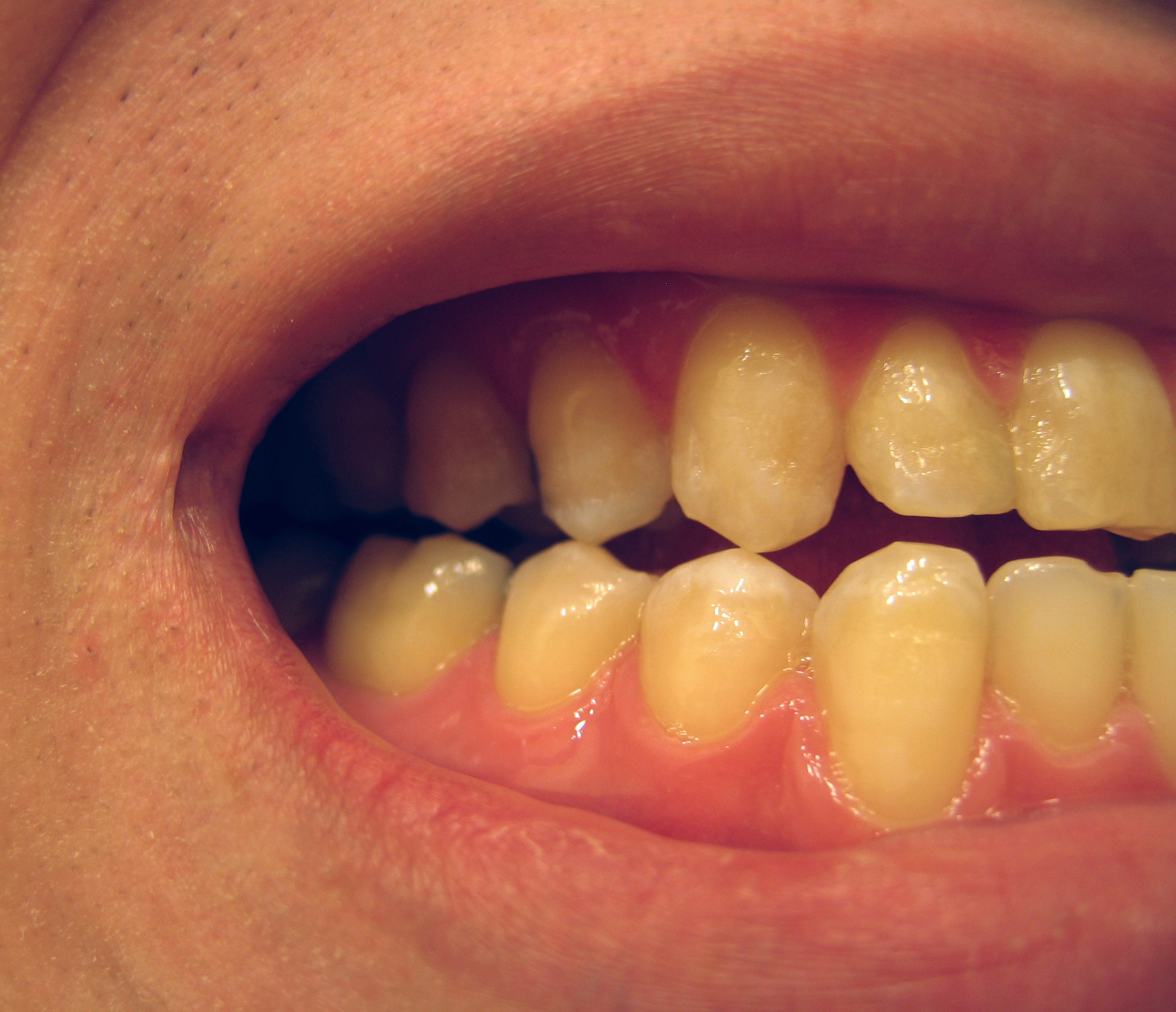
- The teeth of the right side of the mouth, shown contacting the teeth in the opposing jaw with their cusp tips

Details

Identifiers
- Latin: cuspis dentis
- TA98: A05.1.03.010
- TA2: 925
- FMA: 56481

1. Tooth; 2. Enamel; 3. Dentin; 4. Dental pulp; 5. cameral pulp; 6. root pulp; 7. Cementum; 8. Crown; 9. Cusp; 10. Sulcus; 11. Neck; 12. Root; 13. Furcation; 14. Root apex; 15. Apical foramen; 16. Gingival sulcus; 17. Periodontium; 18. Gingiva; 19. free or interdental; 20. marginal; 21. alveolar; 22. Periodontal ligament; 23. Alveolar bone; 24. Vessels and nerves; 25. dental; 26. periodontal; 27. alveolar through channel

A cusp is a pointed, projecting, or elevated feature. In animals, it is usually used to refer to raised points on the crowns of teeth. The concept is also used with regard to the leaflets of the four heart valves. The mitral valve, which has two cusps, is also known as the bicuspid valve, and the tricuspid valve has three cusps.

== In humans ==
A cusp is an occlusal or incisal eminence on a tooth. Canine teeth, otherwise known as cuspids, each possess a single cusp, while premolars, otherwise known as bicuspids, possess two each. Molars normally possess either four or five cusps. In certain populations the maxillary molars, especially first molars, will possess a fifth cusp situated on the mesiolingual cusp known as the Cusp of Carabelli.

One other variation of the upper first premolar is the 'Uto-Aztecan' upper premolar. It is a bulge on the buccal cusp that is only found in Native American Indians, with highest frequencies of occurrence in Arizona. The name is not a dental term; it comes from a regional linguistic division of Native American Indian language groups.

== Cusps on the molars of therian mammals ==
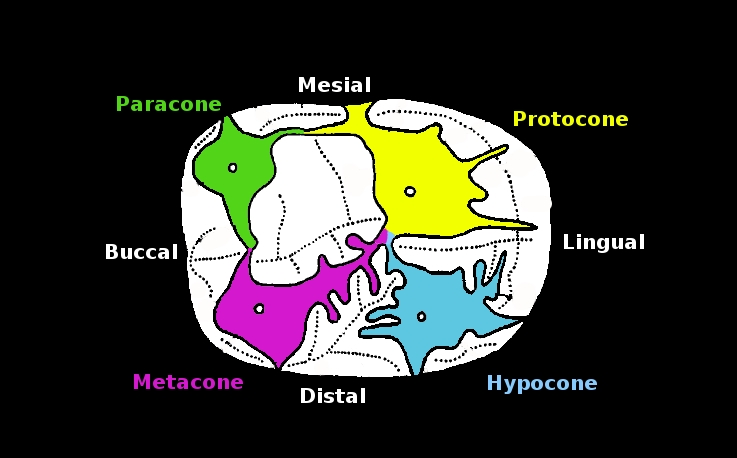
Right upper molar of a human, showing the four main upper molars cusps. Directions are mesial (towards the front of the skull), distal (towards the rear), buccal (outwards, towards the cheek), and lingual (inwards, towards the tongue)

There are four main cusps found on the molars of the upper dentition of therian mammals.

=== Hypocone ===
The hypocone is found on the distal lingual side of the tooth. It fits into the grooves of the lower dentition and is an adaptation for the overall grinding and tearing of foods using the occlusal (chewing side) of the tooth surface during occlusion or mastication (chewing). Its strength is due to the thickness of the enamel which differs among species of hominids. The hypocone appears to have evolved independently more than twenty times in different mammal groups during the Cenozoic period.

=== Metacone ===
The metacone is a cusp on the molars of the upper dentition in hominids. It is found at the buccal distal area of the tooth. The crests between the cusps are adaptations for slicing food during occlusion or mastication (chewing).

=== Paracone ===
The anterior of the three cusps of a primitive upper molar that in higher forms is the principal anterior and outside cusp.

=== Protocone ===
The protocone is founding the molars of the upper dentition in Placental and Marsupial vertebrates. It is found at the mesiolingual area of the tooth. The crests between the cusps are adaptations for slicing food during occlusion or mastication (chewing).

== See also ==
- Mamelon
- Cusp of Carabelli
- Talon cusp

== Bibliography ==
- Ash, Major M.; Nelson, Stanley. Wheeler'S Dental Anatomy, Physiology and Occlusion, 8th edition.
