= Cusp of Carabelli =

Feature of human teeth

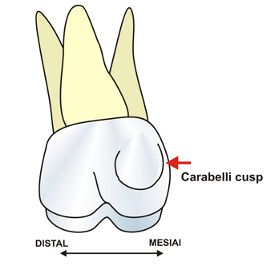
- Diagram indicating cusp of Carabelli

Details

Identifiers
- Latin: tuberculum anomale
- TA98: A05.1.03.071
- FMA: 74035

The cusp of Carabelli, Carabelli's tubercle, or tuberculum anomale of Georg Carabelli is a small additional cusp at the mesiopalatal line angle of maxillary first molars. This extra cusp is usually found on the secondary maxillary first molars and is rarely seen on primary maxillary second molars even less likely on other molars. This cusp is entirely absent in some individuals and present in others in a variety of forms. In some cases, the cusp of Carabelli may rival the main cusps in size. Other related forms include ridges, pits, or furrows. This additional cusp was first described in 1842 by the Hungarian Georg Carabelli (Carabelli György), the court dentist of the Austrian emperor Franz Joseph I.

The cusp of Carabelli is a heritable feature. Kraus (1951) proposed that homozygosity of a gene is responsible for a pronounced tubercle, whereas the heterozygote shows slight grooves, pits, tubercles or bulge. Later studies showed that the development of this trait is affected by multiple genes. According to Stimson and Mertz, this trait is found in 50% of European Americans, 34% of African Americans, and 5-20% of Native Americans.

Although it is sometimes referred to in textbooks as the Cusp of Carabelli, it is actually a tubercle, as it is may be made only of enamel, and may not contain dentin but never has a root underneath. It is unlikely, but entirely possible for the cusp to have a pulp horn. If the cusp is large, approaching the size of a regular cusp, then it will typically be formed of dentin and enamel.

The Carabelli cusp is present in several archaic human species such as Neanderthals, and it is believed that it serves to reduce stress on the teeth by increasing their surface area.

== See also ==
- Dens evaginatus
- Talon cusp
- Tubercle
