= KBG syndrome =

Genetic disease

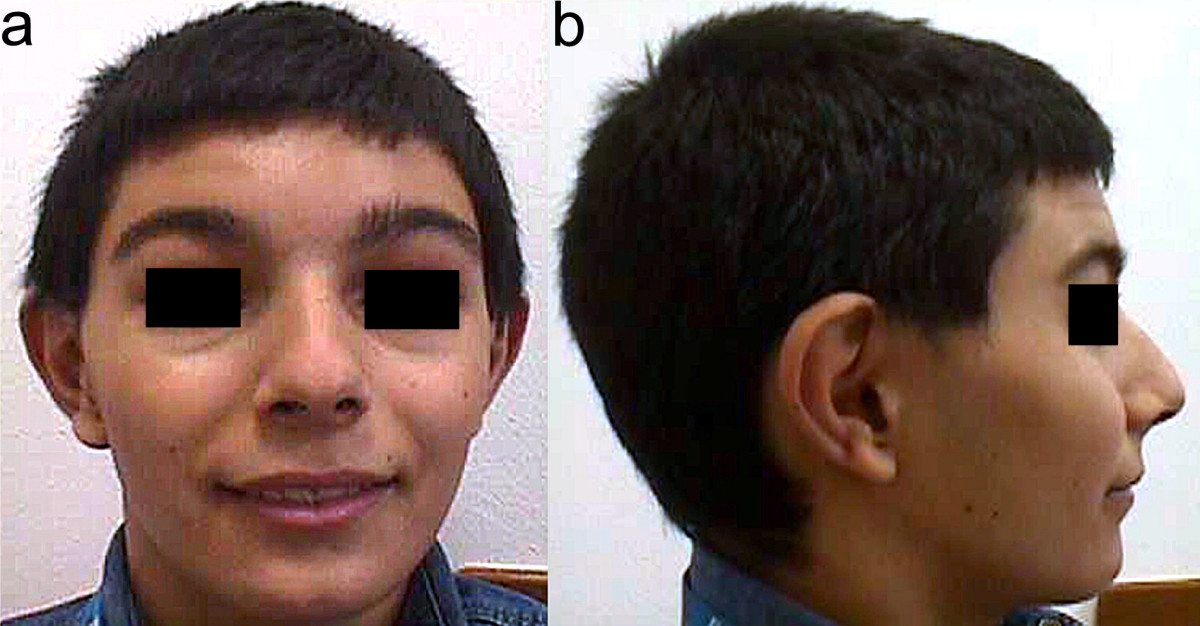
- A KBG syndrome patient with typical facial dysmorphisms
- Symptoms: macrodontia, brachycephaly, hypertelorism, synophrys, long philtrum, thin upper lip
- Causes: Mutation of the ANKRD11 gene

KBG syndrome is a rare genetic disease that is the result of a mutation in the ANKRD11 gene at location 16q24.3. Only about a hundred known cases have been reported, although it is expected to be under-reported.

The syndrome was first described by Herrmann in 1975 in three distinct families. Herrmann proposed the name KBG syndrome after the initials of affected families' last names, which are not known to the general public.

== Characteristics ==
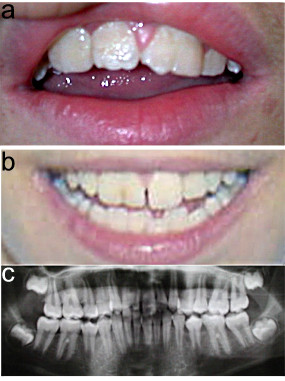
Teeth in KBG syndrome.

Features of individuals with KBG may include:

- Distinctive facial features
  - Unusually large upper front teeth (macrodontia)
  - A short, wide skull (brachycephaly)
  - Wide eyebrows that may grow together (synophrys)
  - Prominent nasal bridge
  - Thin upper lip
  - Widely spaced eyebrows (hypertelorism)
  - A longer space between the bridge of the nose and upper lip (long philtrum)
- Skeletal abnormalities
  - Cervical ribs
  - Delayed bone age
  - Curved Pinky Fingers
  - Flat Feet
  - Short Stature
- Psychiatric features
  - Autism-like behavior
  - ADHD
  - Anxiety
  - Mild to moderate intellectual disability

== Patient support organizations ==
KBG Foundation
