= Ankyrin repeat domain 11 =

Protein-coding gene in the species Homo sapiens

ANKRD11

Identifiers
- Aliases: ANKRD11, ANCO-1, ANCO1, LZ16, T13, ankyrin repeat domain 11, ankyrin repeat domain containing 11
- External IDs: OMIM: 611192; MGI: 1924337; GeneCards: ANKRD11

Gene location (Human)
Chr.	Chromosome 16 (human)
Band	16q24.3	Start	89,267,630 bp
Band	16q24.3	End	89,490,561 bp

Gene location (Mouse)
Chr.	Chromosome 8 (mouse)
Band	8|8 E1	Start	123,610,561 bp
Band	8|8 E1	End	123,769,016 bp
RNA expression pattern
Bgee	Human / Mouse (ortholog); Top expressed in: tendon of biceps brachii; sural nerve; stromal cell of endometrium; anterior pituitary; epithelium of colon; left ovary; right ovary; skin of abdomen; upper lobe of left lung; right lung / Top expressed in: Rostral migratory stream; aortic valve; tail of embryo; ascending aorta; supraoptic nucleus; genital tubercle; hand; lumbar subsegment of spinal cord; ciliary body; granulocyte; More reference expression data
BioGPS	n/a
Orthologs
Databases	NCBI: entry; OMA: entry
Species	Human	Mouse
Entrez	29123	77087
Ensembl	ENSG00000167522	ENSMUSG00000035569
UniProt	Q6UB99	E9Q4F7
RefSeq (mRNA)	NM_001256182; NM_001256183; NM_013275	NM_001081379
RefSeq (protein)	NP_001243111; NP_001243112; NP_037407	NP_001074848
Location (UCSC)	Chr 16: 89.27 – 89.49 Mb	Chr 8: 123.61 – 123.77 Mb
PubMed search
- Wikidata
View/Edit Human	View/Edit Mouse

Ankyrin repeat domain 11 is a protein that in humans is encoded by the ANKRD11 gene.

== Function ==
This locus encodes an ankyrin repeat domain-containing protein. The encoded protein inhibits ligand-dependent activation of transcription. Mutations in this gene have been associated with KBG syndrome and Cornelia de Lange syndrome. Alternatively spliced transcript variants have been described. Related pseudogenes exist on chromosomes 2 and X.
