= Georg Carabelli =

Hungarian dentist (1787–1842)

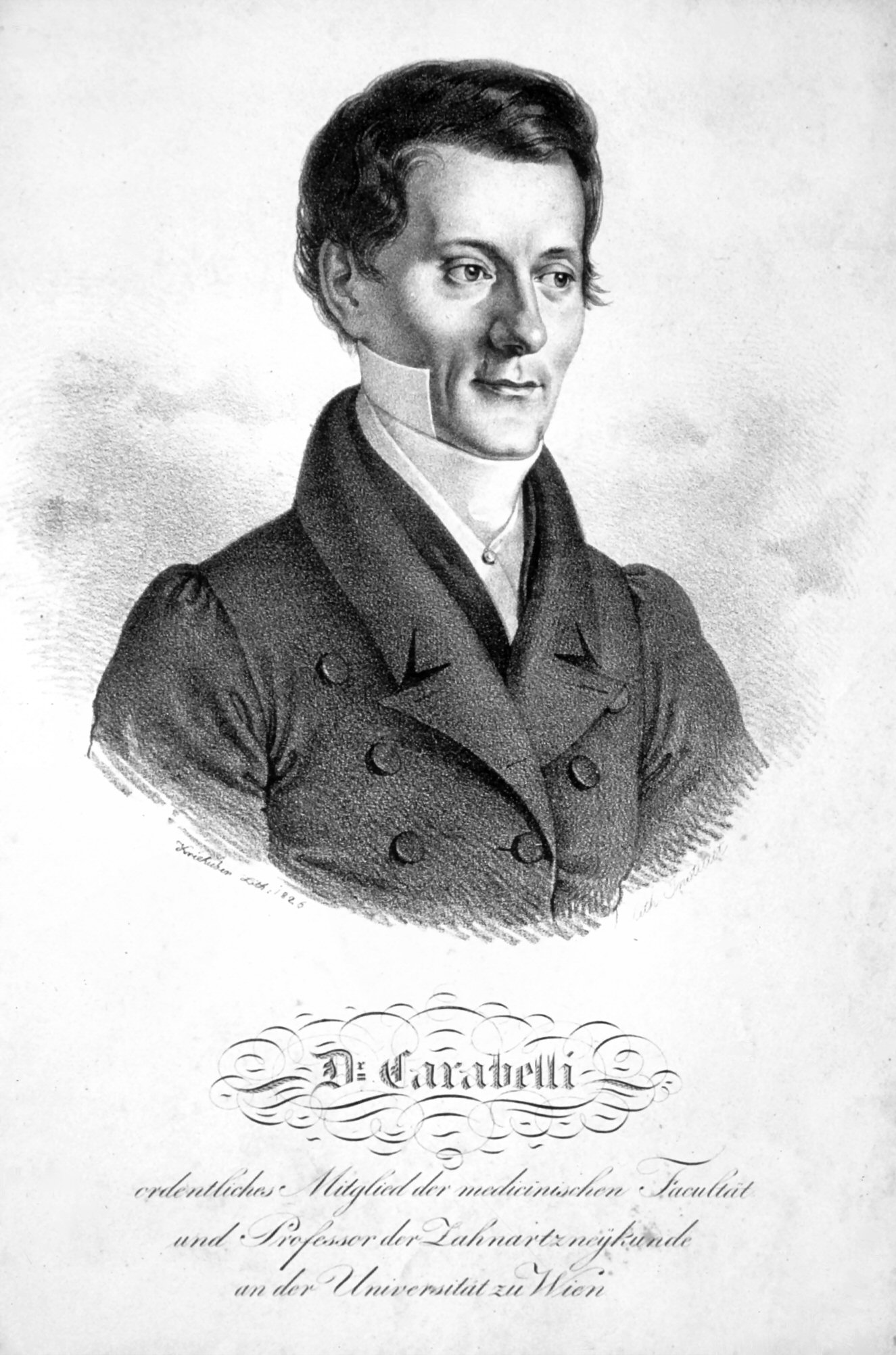
Georg Carabelli, 1826

Georg Carabelli, Edler von Lunkaszprie (Squire of Lunkaszprie) (Hungarian: Carabelli György) (December 11, 1787, in Pest – October 24, 1842, in Vienna) was a prominent Hungarian dentist and professor of dental surgery in Vienna. He held a minor noble rank, which referenced the town of Lunkaszprie (now Luncasprie, in Bihor County Romania).

Georg Carabelli was a court dentist to the Austrian Emperor and co-founder of the stomatology clinic at the University of Vienna. The Cusp of Carabelli, a small additional cusp sometimes found on the mesiolingual corner of an upper molar, was first illustrated in his textbook of oral anatomy, published in 1842, and later described in his handbook of dentistry, published posthumously in 1844. He wrote numerous textbooks and monographs.

== Monographs ==
- Carabelli, Georg: Geschichtliche Übersicht der Zahnheikunde, Vol. 1. Wien, 1831
- Carabelli, Georg: Systemisches Handbuch der Zahnheilkunde. Anatomie des Mundes, Vol. 2. Braunmüller und Seidel, Wien, 1844

== Notes ==
- Szinnyei, József. Magyar írók élete és munkái ("The life and works of Hungarian writers") Arcanum, Budapest, 2000, ISBN 963-86029-9-6
