= Tooth gemination =

- Specialty: Dentistry

Tooth gemination, also known as schizodontia, twinning, or double teeth, occurs when a single tooth germ splits during development. Splitting of the tooth may be partial or complete. If the splitting is complete, the extra tooth is known as a supernumerary tooth. Tooth gemination is difficult to distinguish from tooth fusion; thus, both conditions are often referred to as “double teeth”.

Double teeth can cause other dental problems such as crowding, ectopic eruption of adjacent teeth, gum issues, cavities, malocclusion, poor esthetics, and more. Treatment depends on whether the tooth is primary or permanent, the degree of splitting, and its functional and esthetic impact.

== Diagnostic features ==
=== Clinical ===
Double teeth are more common in primary teeth, with a prevalence of 0.5-0.7%, but can occur in permanent teeth. Unlike tooth fusion, tooth gemination is more common in the maxillary incisors and canines. Like tooth gemination, tooth fusion is more common in the anterior teeth (incisors and canines). Double teeth affect both sexes equally and some studies report higher occurrence in Asian and Indigenous populations. If a double tooth is present, then there may be a higher chance of other dental anomalies, such as macrodontia, tooth transposition, delayed root formation or tooth eruption.

Double teeth are usually larger than normal teeth and have a groove/fold in the enamel on the labial surface that can extend further down the root. In tooth gemination, this groove often symmetrically divides the tooth in half.

Mader’s “two-tooth” rule can help distinguish between tooth fusion and gemination. If the double tooth is counted as two teeth and the number of teeth in the mouth is increased, then the double tooth is likely due to tooth gemination. If the double tooth is counted as two teeth, and the number of teeth in the dental arch is normal, the double tooth is likely due to fusion.

=== Radiographic ===
In tooth gemination, the pulp chambers and root canals tend to be joined, unlike in tooth fusion, where they tend to be separate. However, the degree of separation will depend on the stage of tooth development when the gemination occurred, so the pulp chamber and/or root canal may or may not be involved.

== Disease mechanism ==
Tooth gemination occurs when a developing tooth germ splits. The exact cause of tooth gemination is unknown but involves changes in embryonic tooth development. Environmental (e.g. trauma, thalidomide exposure, hypervitaminosis A of the mother, viral infections), systemic, and genetic factors can cause formation of double teeth. While the specific pathophysiology of double teeth is difficult to determine, many purport it is due to force that brings tooth germs close together during development with necrosis of the tissue separating them allowing for the enamel organ and dental papilla to unite. The extent of gemination depends on when during tooth development the tooth germ splits.

== Treatment ==
Management of tooth gemination is similar to that of tooth fusion, except that in gemination the root systems of the double teeth tend to be united and thus endodontic treatment would likely be required.

== Related abnormalities of the dentition ==
- Amelogenesis imperfecta
- Dentinogenesis imperfecta
- Hyperdontia – More than the average number of teeth
- Anodontia – Lack of tooth development
