= Tooth fusion =

Tooth fusion (also known as syndontia or double teeth) occurs when two separate tooth germs fuse to form one tooth. The fusion may be complete (involves crown and root) or partial (involves only the crown), depending on the stage of tooth development when the teeth started to fuse. Tooth fusion is difficult to distinguish from tooth gemination, thus, both conditions are often referred to together as “double teeth”.

Double teeth can cause other dental problems such as crowding, ectopic eruption of adjacent teeth, gum issues, cavities, malocclusion, poor esthetics, and more. Treatment depends on whether the tooth is a primary or permanent tooth, the degree of fusion, and its functional & esthetic impact.

== Diagnostic features ==
=== Clinical ===
Double formations, joined teeth, dental twinning or double teeth are more common in primary teeth with a prevalence of 0.5 - 0.7%, but can occur in permanent teeth. Unlike tooth gemination, tooth fusion is more common in the mandibular incisors. Like tooth gemination, tooth fusion is more common in the anterior teeth (incisors and canines). Double teeth affect both sexes equally and some studies report higher occurrence in Asian and Indigenous populations. If a double tooth is present, then there may be a higher chance of other dental anomalies (see Related Abnormalities section).

Double teeth are usually larger than normal teeth, may have an incisal notch present on the crown of the tooth, and may have a groove/fold in the enamel on the labial surface that can extend further down the root. In fused teeth, this groove may not symmetrically divide the tooth in half if one of the fused teeth is abnormally shaped or an extra tooth.

Mader’s “two-tooth” rule can help distinguish between tooth fusion and gemination. If the double tooth is counted as two teeth and the number of teeth in the mouth is normal, then the double tooth is likely a fused tooth. However, in some rare cases a tooth is fused to an extra tooth in which case counting the double tooth as two teeth will result in an increased number of teeth in the mouth.

=== Radiographic ===
Fused teeth tend to have separate pulp chambers and root canals, unlike in tooth gemination which tends to have a single pulp chamber and root canal. However, the degree of separation will depend on where & when the fusion occurred so the pulp chamber and/or root canal may be completely fused into one.

== Disease mechanism ==
Tooth fusion occurs when at least the dentin of developing tooth germs fuse. When only the cementum (root portion) of teeth is fused, this is known as concrescence.

The exact cause of tooth fusion is unknown, but is the result of alterations in embryonic tooth development. Environmental (e.g. trauma, thalidomide exposure, hypervitaminosis A of the mother, viral infections), systemic, and genetic factors can cause formation of double teeth. While the specific pathophysiology of double teeth is difficult to determine, many purport it is due to force that brings tooth germs close together during development with necrosis of the tissue separating them allowing for the enamel organ and dental papilla to unite. The extent of fusion depends on when during tooth development this union occurs.

== Treatment and management ==
Whatever the cause of the double tooth (fusion or gemination), management depends on the morphology of the crown, root, & endodontic system, the type of dentition (primary or permanent), and the orthodontic (e.g. crowding, malocclusion, ectopic eruption or impaction of adjacent teeth), periodontal, esthetic, & other functional concerns.

If the double tooth will have little impact functionally or esthetically, then it can be monitored with an emphasis on oral hygiene and prevention (e.g. topical fluoride).

The groove present on the enamel of double teeth can increase risk of complications and depending on how far the groove extends down the root even gum issues. Thus, if possible this groove can be sealed to decrease risk.

As double teeth are large and tend to be in the visible anterior teeth, one may consider altering their shape to improve esthetics. The tooth can be selectively grinded to achieve a more esthetic shape. A dental crown may even be placed to achieve this. If the two teeth have separate root systems, then they can be cut in half, however, root canal treatment may be needed. Alternatively, instead of cutting the tooth in half and leaving both teeth, one of the double teeth can be removed after splitting the tooth structure. This too may require root canal treatment and/or reshaping of the tooth that is not removed. In the previous scenarios, if the double tooth is separated without doing root canal treatment, then root canal treatment may be needed in the future as connections may exist between the root systems of double teeth even if they appear separate on an x-ray. Finally, the double tooth could be removed and the space replaced by autotransplantation of another tooth or closing the space using braces.

Tooth fusion
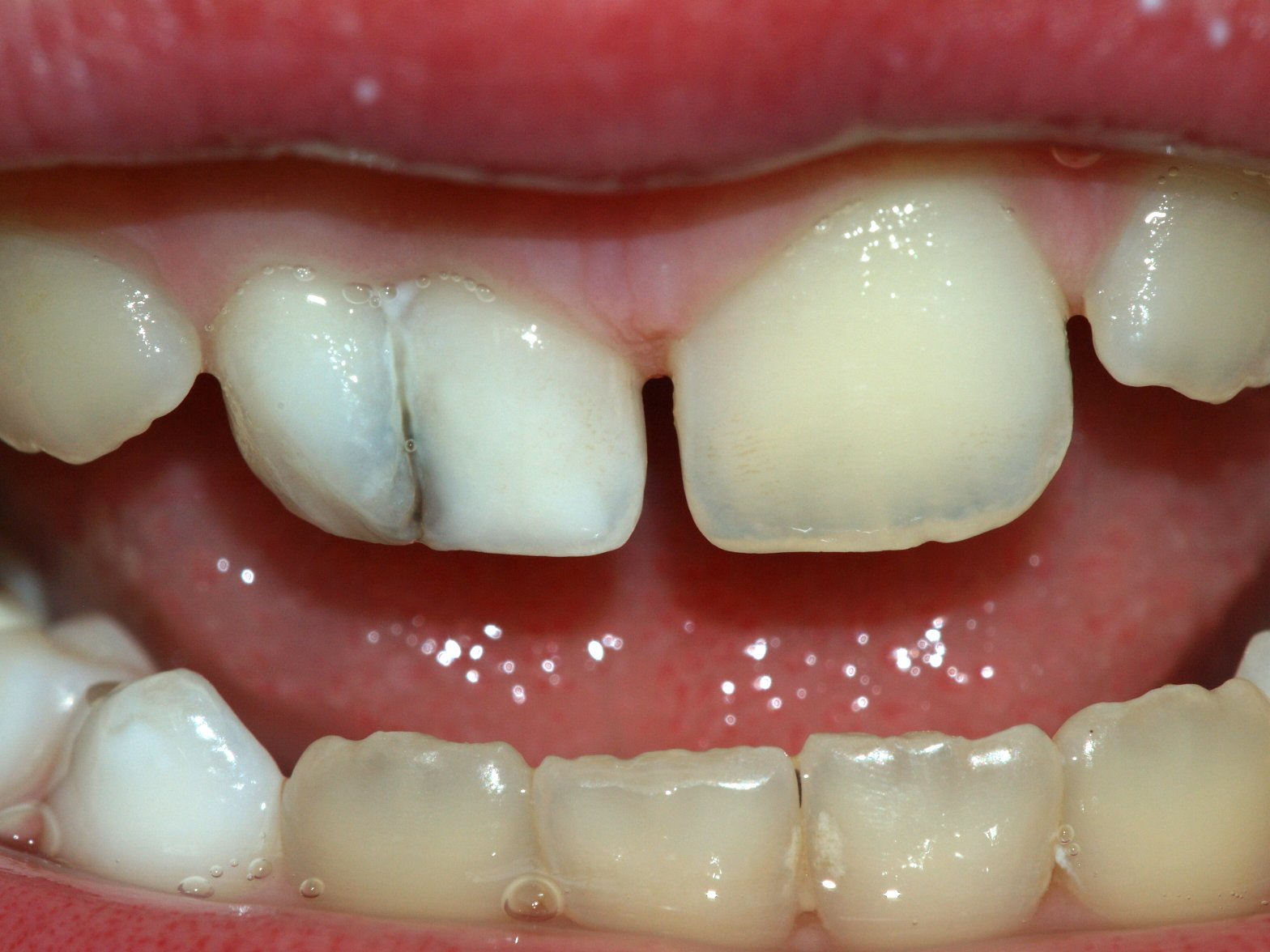
- The fusion of two deciduous teeth.
- Specialty: Dentistry

=== Related abnormalities ===
- Tooth Gemination
- Amelogenesis imperfecta
- Dentinogenesis imperfecta
- Hyperdontia – More than the average number of teeth
- Anodontia – Lack of tooth development
