= Ectopic tooth =

Malpositioned tooth which erupts elsewhere than the oral cavity

Ectopic Tooth
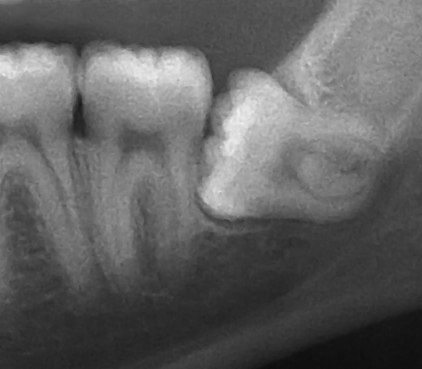
- Impacted wisdom tooth with a horizontal orientation
- Specialty: Dentistry
- Symptoms: Pain, swelling, infection, misalignment
- Causes: Genetic factors, injuries, abnormal growth
- Diagnostic method: X-rays, CT scans
- Treatment: Extraction, surgery, orthodontic treatment
- Prognosis: Good with early detection and treatment
- Frequency: Rare

An ectopic tooth, also known as an impacted tooth, is a tooth that develops in an abnormal position (ectopia) and fails to erupt into its normal location in the oral cavity. Ectopic teeth can cause a variety of symptoms, such as pain, swelling, and infection, and they can lead to more serious complications if left untreated.

This condition can affect both deciduous teeth and permanent teeth, although it is more common in the permanent teeth.

Ectopic teeth may commonly occur within the dentate region of the jaws. Other common sites for ectopic teeth include the maxillary sinus, the nasal cavity, the mandibular condyle, and the palate. In some exceptional cases, they can occur near the eye socket such as in the eyelid; it was first reported in 1934.

The cause of ectopic teeth is not always clear, but it may be related to genetic factors or developmental abnormalities.

Diagnosis of ectopic teeth typically involves a comprehensive dental examination, including X-rays and other imaging tests. Treatment options for ectopic teeth depend on the location and severity of the condition, as well as the age and overall health of the patient. In some cases, observation and monitoring may be sufficient, while in other cases, surgical intervention may be necessary to remove the ectopic tooth and prevent further complications.

In addition to the physical symptoms, ectopic teeth can also have psychological and social impacts on affected individuals, particularly if the condition affects their appearance or causes them embarrassment or self-consciousness. As with any dental or medical condition, early diagnosis and treatment of ectopic teeth can help to prevent complications and improve outcomes for patients.

== Etiology ==
The etiology of ectopic teeth is complex and multifactorial, arising from an interplay between genetic predisposition, local anatomical constraints, and environmental factors. Mutations in genes such as the MSX1 and PAX9 disrupt the signaling pathways responsible for determining the initial position and eruption pathway of the tooth bud.

Under-development of the bones of the upper jaw or larger than normal teeth can lead to crowding and subsequent tilting of molars. For canines, the guidance theory suggests that without adjacent lateral incisor root for guidance, the canine can erupt displaced in the palate.

Finally, environmental and pathological factors need to be reviewed as well. Trauma to deciduous dentition or cystic lesion can directly and physically displace the developing tooth bud. These disturbances can disrupt the odontogenic process between epithelial and mesenchymal tissue (Arora et al., 2023).

== Classification ==
Ectopic teeth can be classified in several ways depending on the eruption pattern, the likelihood of self-correction, and the degree of impact on adjacent teeth. A classification was published in 1957 by Young, which describes ectopic eruption of the maxillary first permanent molar as either reversible or irreversible.

1. In reversible, or "jump", cases the molar initially follows an abnormal mesial path and causes atypical resorption of the distal surface of the second primary molar but later frees itself and erupts into a normal position.
2. In irreversible, or "hold", cases the molar remains locked against the cervical area on the distal surface of the second primary molar and fails to correct its eruption path, often leading to progressive resorption and requiring clinical intervention.

Bjerklin and Kurol added further detail to this system by noting that in reversible cases, the second primary molar typically remains in a relatively forward (mesial) position after the permanent molar has erupted. In contrast, irreversible cases show persistent locking of the permanent molar and a higher risk of premature loss of the affected primary molar.

Additional classification systems emphasise the severity of structural changes rather than eruption behaviour. Barberia-Leache et al. introduced a four-grade scale based on the extent of resorption of the second primary molar.

Grade 1 denotes mild involvement limited to the cementum or minimum penetration of the dentin. Grade 2 reflects moderate dentine resorption without pulp exposure. Grade 3 represents severe resorption extending to the distal root with associated pulp exposure. Grade 4 indicates very severe resorption affecting the mesial root of the second primary molar.

Harrison and Michal proposed an alternative system centred on the degree of impaction, evaluated radiographically using the position of the distal marginal ridge of the second primary molar on bitewing images. Their system includes: (1) normal eruption, with no evidence of impaction; (2) minimal lock, where the permanent molar is impacted by less than half the width of the marginal ridge; and (3) severe lock, in which the impaction exceeds half the width of the marginal ridge.

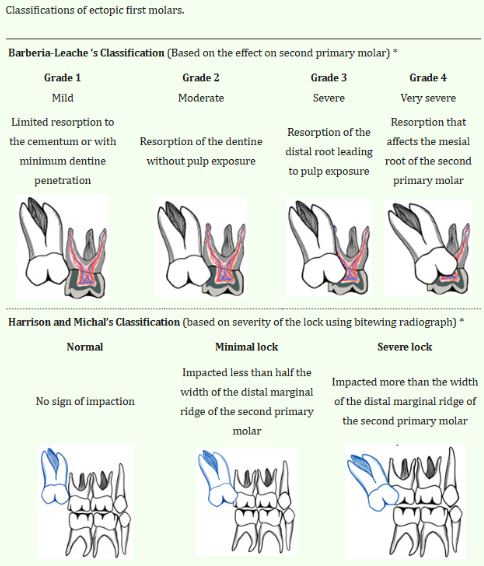

== Diagnosis ==
The diagnosis of ectopic tooth relies on early detection, ideally during the early mixed dentition stage around age 8. It is detected either incidentally during routine clinical evaluation or through targeted radiographic assessment. The teeth most frequently affected are the first permanent molars and maxillary canines. For permanent molars, ectopic eruption should be suspected when there is an eruption delay exceeding six months relative to the contralateral tooth or when clinical asymmetry is evident. Screening for maxillary canines includes inspection and palpation from age 8, its absence or distal tipping of the lateral incisor may indicate palatal displacement. Radiographically, panoramic radiographs (OPGs) serve as the primary screening tool, providing an overview of tooth position, angulation, and morphology. They also aid in prognosis. Cone-Beam Computed Tomography (CBCT) offer precise three-dimensional localisation with a higher radiation dose than OPGs.

== Clinical Relevance ==
The complications arising from ectopic eruption vary according to the tooth's location, direction of displacement, and the presence of associated pathology such as cyst formation. One of the most frequent consequences is impaction of adjacent teeth, particularly observed with ectopic maxillary canines. An abnormal eruption path can disrupt the normal sequence of tooth emergence, resulting in crowding, delayed eruption, or malalignment. Such disturbances may contribute to malocclusion, including midline deviation, spacing irregularities, and rotation of neighbouring teeth, ultimately affecting mastication, speech, and facial aesthetics. Root resorption of adjacent teeth represents another significant complication. Ectopic maxillary canines are well documented as a cause of lateral incisor resorption due to their close anatomical relationship during eruption. This process is often silent in early stages but may progress to irreversible damage, necessitating complex restorative care or extraction. Ectopic eruption may also predispose to dentigerous cyst formation, particularly when associated with unerupted permanent or supernumerary teeth. These cysts arise from fluid accumulation between the reduced enamel epithelium and the crown of the impacted tooth. If untreated, they may enlarge and lead to bone destruction, cortical expansion, discomfort, or displacement of adjacent teeth. In rare cases, ectopic teeth may migrate into atypical anatomical sites, including the nasal cavity, maxillary sinus, or mandibular condyle. Such presentations may be associated with chronic sinusitis, nasal obstruction, recurrent infection, fistula formation, pain, or swelling, depending on the extent of local involvement. Beyond functional and pathological concerns, psychological and aesthetic impacts are also important, particularly in younger patients. Delayed or absent eruption of anterior teeth can noticeably affect smile appearance and self-esteem, often necessitating orthodontic, prosthetic, or surgical intervention.

== Treatment and Management ==
The management of ectopic teeth is influenced by multiple factors, including patient age, the position and orientation of the ectopic tooth, the presence of associated pathology, and the likelihood of achieving a functional and aesthetic outcome. In younger, asymptomatic patients without radiographic or clinical evidence of pathology, a conservative observational approach may be appropriate, particularly when there is a reasonable potential for spontaneous eruption (Shaw et al., 2015). When favourable eruption conditions exist, surgical exposure followed by orthodontic traction is often the treatment of choice, as it allows guided eruption into the dental arch while preserving the natural dentition (Baccetti, 2007; Shah et al., 2015; Husain et al., 2010). Most ectopic teeth can be repositioned using orthodontic appliances, although surgical exposure may be required prior to the application of orthodontic mechanics. If conservative or interceptive measures, such as removal of supernumerary teeth, space creation, or extraction of the primary tooth face failure, or when the eruption pathway is clearly unfavourable, more complex surgical–orthodontic interventions are indicated. Contemporary orthodontic management may involve open or closed eruption techniques, guided orthodontic pathways such as the Gopex approach, and the use of temporary anchorage devices, including miniscrews, to improve biomechanical control and minimise risks such as periodontal compromise, root resorption, or anchorage loss (Hirschhaut et al., 2025). Comprehensive management of ectopic eruptions and impactions, affecting teeth from maxillary incisors to mandibular second molars, requires thorough clinical evaluation, contemporary imaging, and careful consideration of mucogingival factors and orthodontic biomechanics. In certain situations, orthodontic repositioning may not be feasible, particularly when the ectopic tooth poses a risk to adjacent structures, exhibits severe displacement, or is located in anatomically challenging areas such as the nasal cavity, maxillary sinus, or mandibular condyle. In such cases, surgical extraction is indicated. Endoscopic-assisted surgical techniques may improve access and reduce morbidity in complex anatomical regions (Tay et al., 2019). Where associated pathology, such as a dentigerous cyst, is present, management may involve marsupialisation or enucleation depending on lesion size, biological behaviour, and the need to preserve surrounding structures (Neville et al., 2016). Although extraction may occasionally be recommended, particularly in cases of severe crowding, this option can compromise aesthetics and must be carefully considered. Given the variability in presentation and treatment complexity, optimal outcomes are best achieved through a multidisciplinary approach involving paediatric dentists, orthodontists, oral and maxillofacial surgeons, and, when indicated, otolaryngologists. Such collaboration ensures accurate diagnosis, appropriate treatment planning, and long-term functional and aesthetic stability (Shah et al., 2015).

== Conclusion ==
In conclusion, ectopic teeth can result in a wide range of complications affecting dental development, surrounding structures, function, and psychosocial well-being. Early diagnosis through clinical examination and imaging, particularly panoramic radiographs and CBCT when indicated, plays a crucial role in preventing or minimizing these complications. Timely multidisciplinary management, often involving paediatric dentistry, orthodontics, oral or maxillofacial surgery, is essential to optimize outcomes and prevent long-term sequelae.
