= Dens invaginatus =

- Other names: Dens in dente, tooth within a tooth
- Specialty: Dentistry

Dens invaginatus (DI), also known as tooth within a tooth, is a rare dental malformation and a developmental anomaly where there is an infolding of enamel into dentin. The prevalence of this condition is 0.3 - 10%, affecting males more frequently than females. The condition presents in two forms, coronal involving tooth crown and radicular involving tooth root, with the former being more common.

DI is a malformation of teeth most likely resulting from an infolding of the dental papilla during tooth development or invagination of all layers of the enamel organ in dental papillae. Affected teeth show a deep infolding of enamel and dentin starting from the foramen coecum or even the tip of the cusps and which may extend deep into the root. Teeth most affected are maxillary lateral incisors (80%), followed by maxillary canines (20%). Bilateral occurrence is also seen (25%).

== Signs and symptoms ==
DI is often asymptomatic with the affected crown showing minimal external deformity. Individuals with an affected tooth may complain of their tooth having an abnormal shape such as being wider mesio-distally or bucco-lingually.

Teeth affected by this condition are at a higher risk for developing caries and periradicular pathology. The thin layer of the infolding enamel could be chipped off easily, providing entrance for microorganisms into the root canal. This can cause abscess formation and displacement of dental structures (i.e. teeth). Early diagnosis and prevention is very important for maintaining tooth vitality. Clinical features such as incisal notching or pronounced talon cusp on lateral incisors could hit at DI and should be investigated with radiographs.

== Cause ==
Cause of DI is unclear. However, there are several theories:

- Genetics
- Infection
- Trauma
- Growth pressure of the dental arches during odontogenesis, causing enamel infolding
- Rapid proliferation of the internal enamel epithelium invades the underlying dental papilla

== Diagnosis ==
During clinical examination, an abnormally shaped tooth can be observed. Teeth with DI can have a conical peg shaped crown, a deep pit on the lingual side, or have an exaggerated talon cusp.

Although examination may reveal a fissure on the surface of an anterior tooth, in mild cases of DI, crowns may present with normal anatomy and are often asymptomatic. Therefore, radiographic examination is necessary to provide a definitive diagnosis. On a periapical radiograph, the invagination lesion will appear as a radiolucent pocket which could extend into the root or be confined to the crown. It is usually seen beneath the cingulum or incisal edge. Larger lesions can appear as fissures. A radiopaque border can also be observed. Pulp may be involved and the root canal could have complex anatomy. Two periapical radiographs are often required with differing horizontal angulation to ensure the lesion is fully visible.

Cone beam computed tomography (CBCT) is useful in diagnosing DI, providing clinicians with a detailed 3D image. CBCT will also assist in determining the feasibility of root canal treatment, apical surgery or other procedures for teeth with DI.

=== Oehlers' classification ===
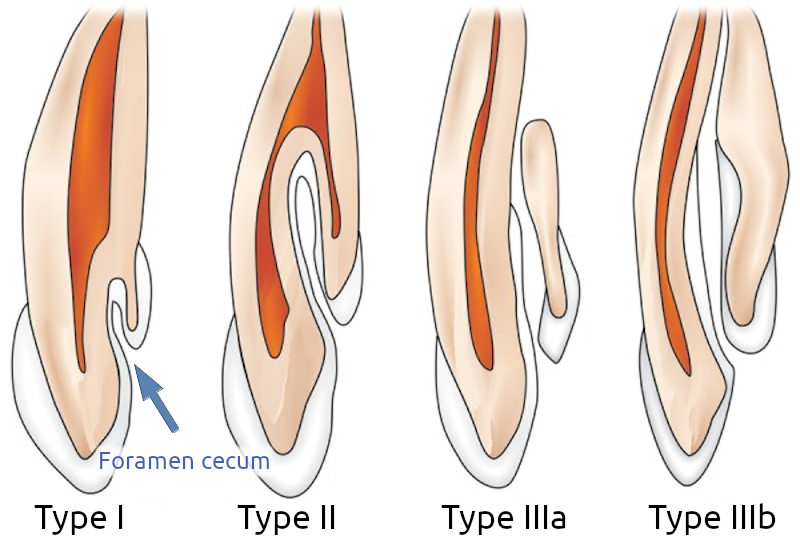
Oehlers' classification with marked Foramen cecum.

- Class I - Partial invagination. It is limited to the crown of tooth. The lesion does not extend pass the cementoenamel junction (CEJ) or the pulp.
- Class II - Partial invagination. It extends beyond the crown and CEJ. Pulp may be involved but remain within the root anatomy. There is no communication of the lesion with periodontal ligament (PDL).
- Class IIIa - Complete invagination. It extends through root and communicates with PDL. It usually does not involve the pulp but can cause anatomical malformation.
- Class IIIb - Complete invagination. It extends through the root and communicates with PDL through apical foramen. Pulpal anatomy may not be directly involved but can cause disruption to the dental anatomy.

=== Histology ===
- No irregularities in the dentin below invagination
- Strains of vital tissue or fine canals that communicates with the pulp could be found
- Enamel lining irregularly structured
- External and internal enamel have different structures

== Management ==
- Preventative treatment - e.g. oral hygiene instructions, fissure sealant
- Intentional replantation
- Root canal treatment with mineral trioxide aggregate
- Periapical surgery with retrograde filling
- Extraction
