= Macrodontia (tooth) =

- Other names: Megadontia, megalodontia
- Specialty: Dentistry

Macrodontia is a type of localized gigantism in which teeth are larger than normal. Macrodontia seen in permanent teeth is thought to affect around 0.03 to 1.9 percent of the worldwide population. Generally, patients with macrodontia have one or two teeth in their mouth that is abnormally large; however, single tooth growth is seen in a number of cases as well.

The three types of macrodontia are true generalized macrodontia, relative generalized macrodontia, and macrodontia of a single tooth. True generalized macrodontia is very rare while Macrodontia of a single tooth is much more commonly seen. Macrodontia should not be confused with other oral conditions such as taurodontism (bull teeth), fusion (double tooth), or the jaws being relatively small, giving the appearance of macrodontia.

== Signs and symptoms ==
As is customary with all aspects of medicine, people have unique inherent differences in terms of their physiology which constitute their individuality. This holds true in dental morphology as well, as people come with different shapes and sizes of teeth; however, people in general have teeth with dimensions which are proportional to the size of their jaw. Specialists are usually able to identify signs of macrodontia upon first glance also given the irregularity in appearance of the tooth in reference to other teeth present as well as what is expected for a patient in terms of tooth size given their age and gender.

There are several symptoms associated with macrodontia, including:

- Misalignment of neighboring teeth and overcrowding.
- Malocclusion resulting in an irregular bite that induces severe jaw joint pain.
- Cavities development due to the irregularity of the teeth shape.
- Significant self-esteem and confidence issues in regards to their physical appearance.

== Causes ==
Macrodontia is not an abnormality which occurs abruptly during adulthood, rather, it happens while the teeth grow. Causes of macrodontia are still under research and an area of study within pediatric dentistry. Commonly, however, macrodontia is associated with genetic syndromes such as otodental syndrome, insulin-resistant diabetes, facial hemihyperplasia, KBG syndrome, Ekman-Westborg-Julian syndrome, and 47 XYY syndrome. Researchers note that genetic mutations which regulate tooth growth could cause teeth to grow abnormally. Some of these genetic conditions associated with this disease are also related with hormonal imbalances and are likely related to the pituitary gland, resulting in deviant tooth growth.

In addition, factors during early childhood have been shown to play a significant role in the development of macrodontia; diet, exposure to toxins or radiation and other environmental factors increase the likelihood of macrodontia growth.

== Pathophysiology ==
Although researchers concede that the actual cause of macrodontia is unknown, there are a number of key causes of this disease which are worth mentioning to understand how this disease originates. Two key mechanisms that are commonly referred to in scientific literature surrounding this condition is how patients suffering with pituitary gigantism exhibit macrodontia as well as those with the genetic disorder KBG syndrome.

Gigantism is a syndrome that causes the excessive secretion of growth hormone (hypersomatotropism) due to a pituitary adenoma. Growth hormones are critical for stimulating somatic growth and regulation a person's metabolism. Growth hormone release hormone, or GHRH, is the key stimulator while somatostatin is the critical inhibitor of the synthesis and release of growth hormone. Growth hormone controls the synthesis of insulin-like growth factor 1, or 1GF-1), which controls growth of the body. IGF-1 is produced principally by the liver, but also by the tissues in the body. Growth hormone will initially exhibit insulin-like effects by increasing the glucose uptake in muscle and fat and stimulating the amino acid uptake and protein synthesis in the liver and muscles, while also inhibiting lipolysis in the adipose tissue. Growth hormone- secreting adenomas will contain a mutant form of the Gs protein; this protein is a stimulatory regulator of adenylate cyclase. Cells containing this mutant form of the Gs protein will continue to secrete growth hormone even in the absence of the growth hormone-releasing hormone (GHRH). Growth hormone is known to increase the formation of bone and hard tissues of the tooth, such as dentine, cementum, and enamel. The growth hormone receptors that are seen in these tissues mediate the local growth responses. And because cells with this mutant form of the Gs protein continue to secrete GH, this could result in the overgrowth of teeth in a patient. Thus, macrodontia is exhibited due to the overexpression of GH through a form of gigantism.

Another key syndrome which results in the expression of macrodontia is KBG syndrome. This is a rare congenital genetic syndrome that is characterized by facial dysmorphism, macrodontia of the permanent upper central incisors, and other skeletal abnormalities. KBG syndrome is caused by a mutation within the ANKRD11 gene or the loss of genetic material on chromosome 16q which involves the ANKRD11 gene. This mutation can occur spontaneously with no family history or be inherited in an autosomal dominant manner. This gene is known to interact with nuclear receptor complexes in order to modify transcriptional activation, while also having a critical role in dental, craniofacial, skeletal, and CNS development and function. As a result of this mutation, the regulation of the development of these areas, namely in terms of proper tooth development, are diverged, resulting in abnormalities in the skeletal and dental systems. In essence, the mutation of this gene leads to conditions to KBG syndrome which has symptoms such as macrodontia as a result of uncontrolled growth of these areas.

== Diagnosis ==
Diagnosis of macrodontia by a dental specialist is first obtained by simple observation, measurement, and comparison with the standard tooth size; this is then later accompanied by conducting a radiological investigation which can be done in a variety of ways.

For a dental specialist to begin the process of diagnose a patient with macrodontia, there needs to be clear signs that there is an abnormality in regards to the size of the tooth in reference to surrounding teeth and average tooth sizes. This is done by noting any disproportions between the teeth and the maxilla. In general, when a patient is seen to have a tooth that is more than two standard deviations larger than the average for their age and gender, it is a major indication of macrodontia at play; this is done using X-rays and can help indicate macrodontia of teeth that have already erupted as well as those that are unerupted.

As is customary for the identification of most dental anomalies of tooth morphology, radiographic investigation is done following the physical examination. Level 1 radiographic examination for suspected macrodontia, however, should only be done after considering the patient's medical records (positive medical history of congenital syndromic conditions related to genetic disorders), the clinical signs and symptoms (the enlarged tooth shape/size), as well as the risk/benefits of exposure to harmful radiation. A specialist may also recommend a different type of radiographic investigation, orthopantomography and intraoral radiography, as a suitable imaging technique. This allows for the imaging of both jaws in a single two-dimensional image as well as reduced radiation; this is reserved for cases where level 1 radiographic investigations are unable to provide adequate information. Additionally, when two-dimensional imaging like the recommendations previously mentioned are unable to provide enough clear information regarding the anatomical relationship of the macrodontia affected tooth with surrounding anatomical structures, the use of CBCT is recommended. The 3D CBCT imaging technique must be as targeted to the area in question as possible as to minimize the exposure of radiation to the patient while also maintaining optimal spatial resolution. Using these imaging techniques, dentists will be able to make an accurate diagnosis of macrodontia as well as the type of macrodontia the patient suffers from.

=== Types of macrodontia ===
==== True generalized ====
In true generalized macrodontia, all teeth grow in larger than normal. This is a symptom of rare genetic disorder cases of growth hormone excess called pituitary gigantism. Other patients may have a disease called Rabson-Mendenhall syndrome which predisposes to generalized macrodontia. This causes insulin resistance and is an autosomal recessive disorder.

==== Relative generalized ====
All teeth appear slightly larger than normal; usually, the jaws are smaller than average. It is sometimes called "pseudomacrodontia", as small jaws give the illusion that the teeth are abnormally large. Genetics play a major role in this type of macrodontia; offspring inherit small jaw size from one parent and relatively large teeth from the other parent.

==== Single tooth ====
A single tooth is larger than the rest. This is unusual and could be the result of fusion and germination that cause enlarged crowns.

== Treatment ==
Following a proper diagnosis by a dental specialist, they will recommend a specific course of treatment based on the severity of the disease. Because the nature of macrodontia is mostly due to genetic syndromes, the specialist will likely recommend that a patient visit a cosmetic dentist. There are three main procedures which can be done by the cosmetic dentist to improve the look of the teeth affected, these include: orthodontics, teeth shaving, and teeth removal.

Macrodontia can result in the misalignment of the affected tooth as well as the neighboring anatomical structures. Orthodontics can assist in straightening the teeth as well as expansion of the jaw if necessary. This is done by using a palate expander which can stretch the patients jaw as to better fit the teeth in a patient's mouth. To counter the tooth crowding as a result of macrodontia, an orthodontist may suggest braces and a retainer to help straighten the teeth to minimize additional misalignment and thus make the teeth appear smaller. This is mostly a treatment for the neighboring teeth as a result of macrodontia of a tooth.

Another cosmetic approach to macrodontia is through teeth shaving, also commonly referred to as tooth recontouring. During this treatment method, a dental specialist will use a gentle sanding device to shave and reduce the size of the tooth. This results in a slightly smaller tooth which may improve visual appearance. This method is generally a safe option for patients with macrodontia who have healthy, strong teeth. This is because if the tooth is too weak, then shaving down a tooth will instead increase sensitivity as well as the possibility of decay. This is a common method of treatment for those with medium to mid-severe cases of macrodontia.

A last-method approach to combat macrodontia is also to simply remove the affected tooth to make more space for the neighboring teeth. By doing so, this will make the teeth appear less crowded and smaller. Those patients that take this route of treatment usually get the affected tooth removed and replace it with dentures or false teeth to enhance the appearance of the mouth. This method is usually used for those who are suffering from a great deal of pain as a result of the overgrown tooth and can not be treated by the other two methods mentioned previously; this is usually the safest route in that case. This treatment option is mostly reserved for severe cases of macrodontia where the patient suffers from severe jaw joint pain as a result of the affected tooth.

== Prognosis ==
Macrodontia is not a lethal disease, rather, it is a disorder which affects the physical appearance of the teeth and can have implications with the surrounding teeth, thereby affecting the overall positioning of the teeth, jaw pain, and other crowding issues resulting in future misalignment. There is no empirical data regarding the effects of macrodontia on life expectancy or the likelihood of remission. This is because once the tooth is either shaved or fully removed, there is no chance of the macrodontia returning, as it is not contagious.

In terms of long term effects, there are a number of complications which can develop as a result of untreated macrodontia. As previously mentioned, the problem that occurs with having teeth that are overly large is that, aside from the abnormal appearance, they can have lasting impacts on the mechanics of a patient's bite, rendering its effectivity much lower than it would be with properly sized teeth. As a result, patients would have long lasting issues with their bite alignment as well as continuous jaw joint pain as a result of having a deviate bite. The development of dental caries due to the abnormal morphology of the overgrown tooth can be more of a short-term impact that can result in long lasting effects of overall tooth health. This is because unless the patient gets treated, these caries will continue to develop and eventually result in continued degradation of the tooth and cause infections to surrounding teeth and gums.

== Epidemiology ==
Macrodontia is a very uncommon dental abnormality which has been reported alongside other dental anomalies. It is reported that macrodontia affects 0.03% of the population. Males seem to have a higher predisposition to the disease, with a prevalence of 1.2%. On the other hand, females have a prevalence of around 0.9%.

Disruptions of regular growth of the teeth and enlargement usually become evident before or between the ages of 11 and 12, when the eruption of the mandibular second premolars usually occur.

== Research direction ==
While there is research regarding the symptoms and effects of macrodontia on patients, there is still a fundamental misunderstanding regarding the specific pathophysiological mechanisms that are exhibited which result in this abnormality. Current research has been able to clearly identify methods of observing and diagnosing a patient by using various imaging techniques. There is also an abundance of information regarding treatment options that are mostly concentrated within the cosmetic branch of dentistry to fix the appearance of the teeth as well as simply removing it to halt continuous pain. There is a number of genetic mutations that have been correlated with the prevalence of macrodontia in patients exhibiting this syndrome, such as KBG syndrome or those who overexpress GH, but how this relates to the hard tissue of the teeth and the mechanism by which it affects the enamel and other related factors have yet to be considered. There is no current clinical trials for treatment of this disease as there are a number of procedures which already exist to make the affected teeth smaller; and if all else fails, dentists can simply remove the tooth and replace it with a veneer or bridge in its place.
