= Mamelon (dentistry) =

Abnormal bumps found on newly erupted incisors

Details

Identifiers
- Latin: mammillae
- TA98: A05.1.03.059
- FMA: 76456

A mamelon (from French mamelon, "nipple") is one of three rounded protuberances which are present on the cutting edge of an incisor tooth when it first erupts through the gum. Mamelons' appearance can be smoothed by a dentist if they have not been worn down naturally by biting and eating foods. Mamelons are present on permanent central and lateral incisors. Mamelons are easiest to observe on the maxillary central incisors, and appear as three small prominences on the incisal edge of the tooth. Mamelons are ordinarily of no clinical importance. Usually, they are worn off early in the life of the tooth.

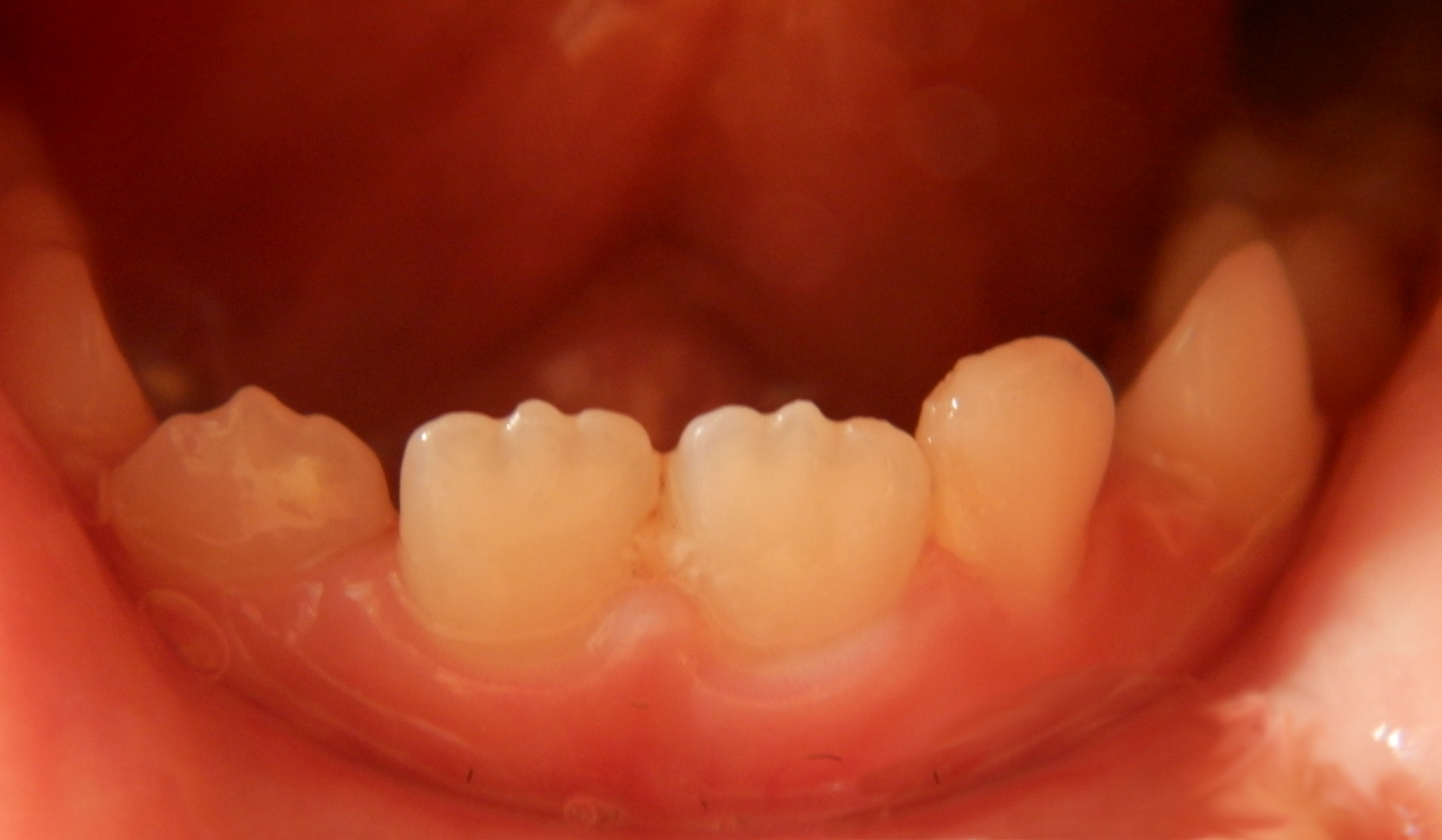
Mamelons on the lower central and lateral right incisors of a seven-year-old boy

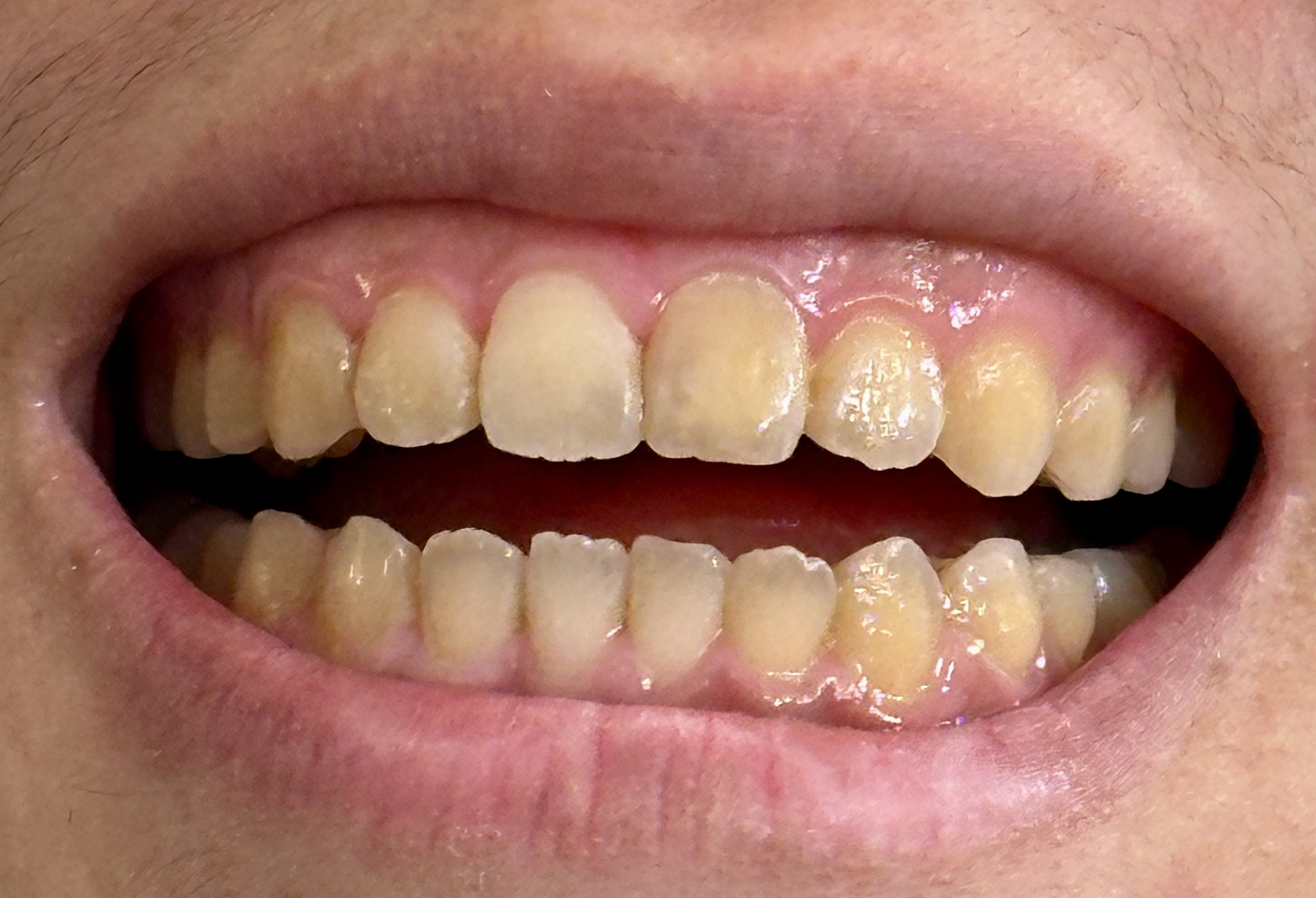
Mamelons still visible on the lower central incisors of a 33-year-old adult.
