= Incontinentia pigmenti achromians =

Skin condition

- Other names: Hypomelanosis of Ito, Linear nevoid hypopigmentation
- Specialty: Dermatology, medical genetics
- Diagnostic method: Clinical; use of Wood's lamp; skeletal imaging; computed tomography and MRI if there are neurological symptoms

Incontinentia pigmenti achromians, also known as hypomelanosis of Ito (HI) or pigmentary mosaicism, is a cutaneous (skin) condition characterized by various patterns of hypopigmentation following the lines of Blaschko on one or both sides of the body. Though the consistency of the skin findings have led to the term "hypomelanosis of Ito", it actually refers to a group of disorders with various genetic causes, including polyploidies and aneuploidies. Based upon the specifics of the genetic defect, the skin findings can be accompanied by a great range of systemic findings, including defects of the ocular, musculoskeletal, and central nervous systems. As opposed to incontinentia pigmenti, hypomelanosis of Ito affects both genders equally. This disorder was first described by Japanese dermatologist Minoru Ito in 1952.

== Diagnosis ==
HI is diagnosed through clinical examination, sometimes with the aid of Wood's lamp to highlight the differences in pigmentation. The skeleton should also be imaged.

A CT scan and magnetic resonance imaging should be completed if the patient has neurologic symptoms, and patients with seizure disorders should undergo electromyography.

== History ==
This disorder was first described by Japanese dermatologist Minoru Ito in 1952.

== See also ==
- List of dental abnormalities associated with cutaneous conditions
- List of cutaneous conditions
