= Cingulum (dentistry) =

Part of the tooth

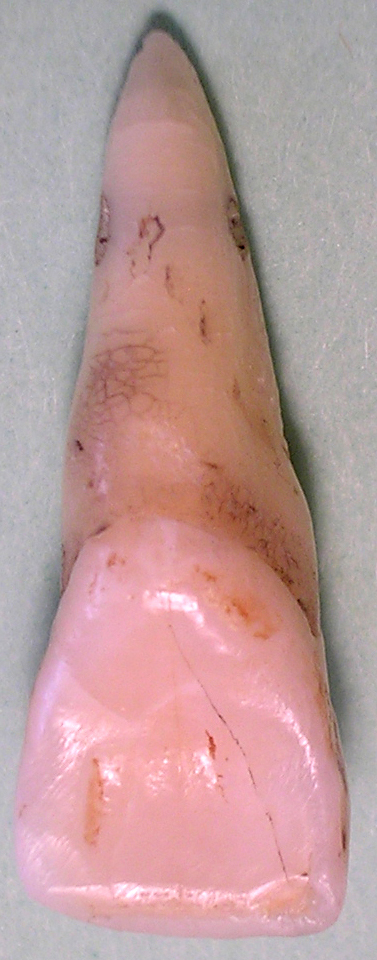
Lingual (interior) view of an upper incisor. The cingulum is highlighted near the base.

In dentistry, the cingulum (Latin: girdle) is an anatomical feature of the tooth and refers to the small raised area of anterior teeth, which includes the central incisors, lateral incisors and canines. It makes up the bulk of the tooth near the gum line and is located at the back of the tooth (on the side closest to the tongue). The convexity of the cingulum from one side of the tooth to the other side resembles a girdle circling the back of the tooth at the cervical third of the anatomical crown. The cingulum represents the developmental lobes at the back of the teeth.

The tooth crown develops from primary growth centres known as developmental lobes. Normal teeth generally consist of three to five lobes. In anterior teeth, the front side of the teeth generally develop from three lobes known as the facial lobes, while the back side of the teeth develops from one lobe known as the lingual lobe. The cingulum develops from the lingual lobe. As the tooth matures over time, the cingulum eventually becomes more defined, which contributes to its overall shape and function.

Originally, the cingulum’s main function was to provide protection for the gingiva (gums) in early mammals. Later on, as teeth evolved, the cingulum was formed as a structural reinforcement to provide support to the tooth and spread the force generated from the incisal or cuspal edge throughout the tooth during chewing or by asymmetrical loads placed on the tooth. This is because it greatly reduces tensile strains in the enamel caused by forces. The size and shape of the cingulum has an effect on the amount of strain the tooth is able to withhold. It also plays a role in directing food during chewing.

== Anatomical features ==
Cingulum is an inverted V shaped ridge found on lingual surface at the cervical third of anterior teeth. The majority of a lingual surface's cervical third is made up of the cingulum. All anterior teeth are formed from four centers of development, referred to as lobes. Three are located on the facial side of the tooth, and one on the lingual side. The three mamelons, or bumps, on the incisal edge of the incisors when they first erupted are remnants of the lobes from which the tooth formed. The cingulum forms from this lingual lobe of development. In contrast, posterior teeth developed from 4 to 5 lobes. Instead of cingulum, posterior teeth have multiple cusp for grinding. There are clear distinctions between primary and permanent teeth in the cingulum. Primary teeth have more prominent and well-developed cingulum compared to their permanent teeth, particularly in the anterior teeth. Besides, the canines have a highly noticeable cingulum, but the maxillary cingulum is more prominent than the one on mandibular canines.

== Function ==
The cingulum plays a significant role in dental occlusion, particularly concerning the stability and function of anterior teeth. The cingulum of maxillary anterior teeth provides a contact area for the incisal edges of mandibular anterior teeth in centric occlusion. It helps in distributing occlusal forces evenly, reducing excessive stress on individual teeth. The cingulum guides mandibular movement, particularly in protrusive and lateral movements. It plays a role in anterior guidance, ensuring smooth occlusal function and protecting posterior teeth from excessive wear. It contributes to the stability of the dental arch by maintaining proper tooth position and contact.

The contour of the cingulum influences the deflection of food away from the gingival margin, potentially reducing food impaction and contributing to periodontal health. Proper curvature can aid in protecting the gingiva during mastication.

The cingulum serves as a reinforcement point by adding bulk to the lingual surface of anterior teeth, enhancing their resistance to fracture and stress. This additional enamel thickness improves the tooth's ability to withstand occlusal forces, reducing the risk of fractures, especially in incisors and canines. The cingulum contributes to tooth stability by providing an anchoring surface for the periodontal ligament fibers. In canines, the well-developed cingulum aids in canine guidance, which protects posterior teeth from excessive lateral forces. Studies suggest that the morphology of the cingulum directly influences the load-bearing capability of anterior teeth, particularly in canines where it plays a critical role in guiding occlusion. Finite element analysis models indicate that the presence of a well-defined cingulum reduces stress concentration in enamel and dentin, improving tooth longevity.

== Role in Speech and Phonetics ==
Various anatomical features of teeth, including the cingula, interact with oral structures during speech. They collectively contribute to speech sound articulation.

Speech production and articulation

Speech occurs when air flows from the lungs to the larynx, where vocal cords vibrate and create sound. This airflow continues into the oral cavity. Articulators, such as the tongue, lips, teeth, alveolar ridge and hard palate, then shape the air in certain ways to form speech sounds.

Consonants are speech sounds produced by a partial or complete blockage of airflow through the vocal tract. The tongue is majorly involved in articulating consonants by creating these blockages when it contacts other structures in the oral cavity. The cingula of anterior upper teeth can play an indirect role in tongue placement for some consonants.

Normal speech involves correct synchronisation between the vocal organs to create precise speech sounds. Alterations in any of these structures can affect tongue placement and airflow patterns. Thus, producing perceived speech distortions which are regarded as speech sound disorders (SSDs). For sounds that require teeth, changes in tooth anatomy and position can therefore contribute to changes in speech. Some speech sounds are more impacted by dental abnormalities than others, depending on the areas the sound is articulated. Dental deviations in the anterior part, majorly affect lip and tongue placement in alveolar, dental and palatal sounds.

Impact of malocclusions on articulation

Malocclusions, including crossbites and anterior open bites, influence articulatory movements, leading to speech sound distortions, omissions or substitutions. Additionally, craniofacial anomalies (such as clefts) can cause orofacial muscle imbalances and with alterations in the function of the orofacial region, speech challenges arise.

The relationship between SSDs and malocclusion is multifactorial and complex. It is related to specific anatomical structures, oral habits, muscular alterations but perhaps to language-specific traits also.

Anterior open bite

Anterior open bite is the occlusal feature most often associated with SSDs. Prolonged non-nutritive sucking is a common cause. This habit is related to speech disorders and myofunctional disorders, which reduce oro-motor abilities. In regards to teeth, proclination of upper incisors and retroclination of lower incisors occurs. The edges of lower incisors do not make contact with the cingula of upper teeth like in an ideal Class I occlusion. This impacts the articulation of linguo-alveolar sounds (/t/, n/, /d/, /l/) and lateral sounds (/l/, /ll/). Sibilant sounds (/s/, /ch/ and /z/) and fricatives affricatives (/v/, /f/) are also impacted as no occlusion between anterior teeth creates an air outlet. This is associated with lisping.

Class II Division 1

In Class II Division 1 malocclusions, bilabial (/p/, /b/, /m/) sounds can be distorted. Due to prominent overjet, the lower lip makes contact with the incisal edges of upper incisors rather than creating a seal with the upper lip. For fricative sounds (/f/, /v/) there is a difficulty in managing air flow anteriorly. Air is forced through the interproximal spaces and gaps between incisal edges of the teeth and the lower lip moves beneath the maxillary incisors, so there is a distortion in these speech sounds.

Class III

In Class III malocclusions, upper incisors are anterior to lower incisors. This affects the articulation of sibilant fricatives /s/ and /z/. The tongue is unable to reach the palatal side and cingula of upper teeth or the alveolar ridge due to its placement under the lower incisors, which creates misarticulation. Labiodental fricatives /f/ and /v/ are also affected as the lower lip has difficulty meeting the upper incisors. Individuals with this type of occlusion often make compensatory articulation gestures for these speech sounds. The upper lip touches the lower incisors for /f/ and /v/ and tongue touches the incisal edge of upper incisors for /s/ and /z/.

Edge-to-edge bites

In edge-to-edge bites, incisal edges of upper and lower incisors meet with no overlap. The phoneme /t/ has been reported as difficult to articulate in such malocclusions.

Dental corrections

Orthodontic treatment can help correct malocclusions and improve articulation as a result. Teeth can be aligned into an ideal occlusal relationship where the lower incisors occlude with or lie below the cingulum plateau of the upper incisors. A combination of orthodontics and speech therapy may be required to rectify some malocclusion and speech challenges. In other cases, orthognathic surgery with orthodontics plus postoperative speech therapy may be necessary.

Denture Design and Speech Intelligibility

In prosthodontics, for complete and partial dentures, features like the cingulum and palatal contour are incorporated to improve speech intelligibility. These features enable natural tongue positions and allow areas of articulation on the palate and anterior teeth which can contribute to easier articulation. In a maxillary complete denture, if tooth position, occlusal vertical dimension, occlusal plane and palatal contours are approximated accurately to the patient’s tongue, speech clarity can be improved.

== Variation and Abnormalities ==
The cingulum can vary in size and how prominent it is. Some teeth may have a more prominent cingulum, while others may have one that is less visible. Certain conditions or abnormalities can also affect the cingulum due to genetic factors, developmental defects, or environmental influences.

Hypoplasia

Enamel hypoplasia is sometimes mistaken for enamel hypomineralization. Enamel hypomineralization occurs when the enamel does not fully harden, leading to weak, discolored teeth that can break easily. It appears as soft, bumpy, or decayed areas on the enamel, usually affecting molars and incisors as they develop.

On the other hand, enamel hypoplasia is when the enamel does not form properly, causing it to be too thin or missing in certain areas, including the cingulum. It appears as brown or yellow stains and exposes the dentin underneath. Hypoplasia is a type of amelogenesis imperfecta, a condition where the enamel is either absent or extremely thin, making teeth more likely to break. The enamel present remains hard but is weak.

Enamel development issues are common. One of the most widespread causes of enamel hypoplasia—amelogenesis imperfecta—affects about 1 in 700 people in developing countries. In the U.S., it is rarer, affecting about 1 in 14,000 people.

There are several reasons why these conditions develop. According to the Indian Journal of Dentistry, they happen when there is a disruption in how enamel forms. To understand this, we need to look at ameloblasts—cells that create enamel. These cells go through six stages: morphogenetic, organizing, formative, maturative, protective, and desmolytic. Enamel hypoplasia occurs during the formative stage, leading to pitting, grooves, or even a complete lack of enamel.

Enamel hypoplasia is a defect that happens while teeth are still developing, so it can affect baby teeth, permanent teeth, or both. It may involve just one tooth or multiple teeth. Hypomineralization, on the other hand, happens in the maturative stage and appears as "chalky" areas on the enamel.

In addition to how enamel forms, these conditions can also be caused by genetic and environmental factors.

Environmental Factors

Issues during pregnancy that may contribute include:

- Gestational diabetes
- A lack of important minerals like calcium and phosphorus or deficiencies in vitamins A, C, or D
- Maternal infections
- Smoking or drug use
- Exposure to certain medications or environmental toxins, such as tetracycline antibiotics or lead

Inherited Factors

Some cases of congenital enamel hypoplasia occur on their own, while others are part of genetic syndromes that affect multiple parts of the body. These conditions are inherited from one or both biological parents. Syndromes linked to enamel hypoplasia include:

- Usher syndrome
- Seckel syndrome
- Ellis-van Creveld syndrome
- Treacher Collins syndrome
- Otodental syndrome
- 22q11 deletion syndrome (Velocardiofacial syndrome)
- Heimler syndrome
- DiGeorge syndrome

Other Causes of Enamel Hypoplasia

- Tooth injury (trauma) that damages the cells responsible for forming enamel
- Certain medical conditions such as jaundice, liver disease, cerebral palsy, and celiac disease

Treatment of dental hypoplasia depends on the symptoms. The main goals are to prevent tooth decay, maintain proper bite alignment, preserve tooth structure, and improve appearance. If a person has enamel hypoplasia or hypomineralization but does not experience pain or sensitivity, dentists may simply monitor the condition during routine check-ups and recommend fluoride toothpaste. However, if a person has cosmetic concerns, tooth sensitivity, or a higher risk of cavities, dentists may suggest fluoride treatments and remineralizing pastes to strengthen the teeth. In some cases, teeth may require bonding, fillings, crowns, or even extractions if the damage is severe. If a person grinds their teeth, a dentist might recommend a nighttime mouthguard to prevent further wear.

Type of Dental Hypoplasia

Turner’s Hypoplasia

Turner’s hypoplasia is a localized enamel defect that usually affects only one tooth, most commonly in permanent teeth.

- If it occurs in a canine or premolar, it is likely caused by an infection that was present when the primary tooth was still in the mouth.
- If it appears in the front teeth (anterior region), it is usually due to trauma to a primary tooth.

Talon Cusp

Talon cusp is a rare dental condition that affects between 0.06% and 7.7% of people, according to a case report in the BMJ Case Reports (2017). It appears as an extra projection, small bump (tubercle), or cusp-like structure on a tooth’s surface, either on the tongue side (lingual) or lip side (facial). It can develop on baby teeth but is more common in permanent teeth.

Talon cusp is mainly caused by excessive growth of dental tissue during tooth development. According to a same case report in BMJ Case Reports (2017), this condition arises because of evagination on the surface of a tooth crown during tooth hardening (calcification) stage. Evagination happens when a part of a structure grows outward from its original position. A dental cusp is an outgrowth on the surface of the tooth that faces the tongue. In some cases, talon cusps may be linked to genetics, but they can also happen randomly without a family history. However, they have been observed in genetic conditions such as Berardinelli-Seip, Mohr, Rubinstein-Taybi, Ellis-van Creveld, Sturge-Weber, and Incontinentia Pigmenti Achromians.

Talon cusps can affect oral health in several ways, such as making it harder to clean the affected tooth properly, interfering with normal biting and chewing, irritating soft tissues, and increasing the risk of dental problems. If a talon cusp appears on the front of the tooth (facial aspect), it may also affect appearance. To maintain good oral health and prevent complications, dental monitoring and treatment may be needed.

Treatment for talon cusp depends on whether it causes problems. Small cusps may not need treatment at all. In some cases, they can be gradually filed down over time by chewing, creating a smoother tooth surface. However, if the cusp is large, causes discomfort, or contains infected tooth pulp, a root canal may be necessary. If the concern is cosmetic, aesthetic restorations can be done.

Dens Invaginatus (DI)

Dens Invaginatus, also called dens in dente (meaning “tooth within a tooth”), is a rare dental condition. It happens when the enamel folds into the dentin during tooth formation, creating what looks like a small tooth inside another tooth. According to the Journal of Oral Research and Review, this condition affects between 0.3% and 10% of people.

The exact cause of DI is unclear, but some theories suggest it may be due to infection, pressure on the enamel, or trauma during tooth development. A 2020 study found that 88% of affected teeth have unique characteristics, such as increased width or a conical (peg-shaped) appearance. DI varies in severity and is classified into three types: Type I, Type II, Type IIIa, and Type IIIb.

Most teeth with DI appear normal on the outside and do not cause symptoms. Because of this, the condition is often diagnosed using X-rays. In some cases, dentists apply methylene blue dye to the back (palatal) surface of the tooth to help locate the invagination (folded area).

Although DI may not always cause symptoms, affected teeth are more prone to decay and infection. The gap between the original tooth and the folded area can easily trap plaque and lead to cavities, which may spread to the tooth’s pulp. If the pulp gets infected, a root canal might be needed. However, in minor cases, the gap can be sealed with composite resin or a sealant to prevent plaque buildup and cavities.

Shovel-Shaped Incisors

Shovel-shaped incisors get their name from their distinctive shape, which includes a prominent back (lingual) ridge and raised edges (marginal ridges), resembling a shovel. These teeth are most commonly found in Asian, Mongoloid, Arctic, and Native American populations.

"Double shoveling" refers to the presence of both pronounced back ridges and additional raised ridges on the front (labial) surface of the tooth.

== Role in Dental Health and Pathology ==
Plaque and caries

The cingulum of anterior teeth has been relegated to being described as an anatomical factor prone to bacterial plaque accumulation and increase of possibility to develop caries or to the generation of occlusal interferences in the shape of premature contacts. Both situations are frequently solved with selective enameloplasty and restorative treatment. Sometimes, there is a groove on the tooth that goes partially through the cingulum and If it is not kept clean, plaque can build up resulting in an increased risk for decay.

There are rare dental developmental anomalies like talon cusp, or dens evaginatus of anterior teeth characterized by the presence of an accessory cusp-like structure projecting from the cingulum area. This occurs in either maxillary or mandibular anterior teeth in both the primary and permanent dentition. These accessory cusps can cause occlusal interferences. The anomalous cusp can generate occlusal trauma and reversible acute apical periodontitis of the opposing tooth.

Dental erosion and attrition

When the cingulum invaginates in posterior teeth, the enamel in the cervical third of the crown, near the enamel-dentin junction, becomes very thin. This area is more susceptible to fractures due to the tensile forces from mastication, leading to a type of lesion known as abfraction. Abfraction is a type of noncarious cervical lesion (NCCL) characterized by loss of tooth tissues with different clinical appearances. Particularly, the cervical wear of abfraction can occur as a result of normal and abnormal tooth function and may also be accompanied by pathological wear, such as abrasion and erosion. During erosion, the cingulum is lost and the erosion is extended into the gingival crevice. In attrition, wear facets are seen on the cingulum and the cingulum shows compression pits consistent with wear in centric occlusion.

Malocclusion

The line of occlusion is a smooth curve passing through the central fossa of each upper molar and across the cingulum of the upper canine and incisor teeth. According to the British Standard Institution (BSI), malocclusion is classified based on how the lower incisor edges relate to the cingulum plateau of the upper incisors. In Class I, the lower incisor edges occlude with or lie immediately below the cingulum plateau of the upper central incisors. In Class II, the lower incisor edges lie posterior to the cingulum plateau of the upper incisors, and this category is subdivided into two divisions: Division 1, where the upper central incisors are proclined or have average inclination, accompanied by an increase in overjet, and Division 2, where the upper central incisors are retroclined, with a minimal or occasionally increased overjet. In Class III, the lower incisor edges lie anterior to the cingulum plateau of the upper incisors, resulting in a reduced or reversed overjet.

The cingulum of anterior teeth has been relegated to being described as an anatomical factor prone to bacterial plaque accumulation and increase of possibility to develop caries or to the generation of occlusal interferences in the shape of premature contacts. Both situations are frequently solved with selective enameloplasty and restorative treatment. Sometimes, there is a groove on the tooth that goes partially through the cingulum and if it is not kept clean, plaque can build up resulting in an increased risk for decay.

There are rare dental developmental anomalies like talon cusp, or dens evaginatus of anterior teeth characterized by the presence of an accessory cusp-like structure projecting from the cingulum area. This occurs in either maxillary or mandibular anterior teeth in both the primary and permanent dentition. These accessory cusps can cause occlusal interferences. The anomalous cusp can generate occlusal trauma and reversible acute apical periodontitis of the opposing tooth.

Dental erosion and attrition

When the cingulum invaginates in posterior teeth, the enamel in the cervical third of the crown, near the enamel-dentin junction, becomes very thin. This area is more susceptible to fractures due to the tensile forces from mastication, leading to a type of lesion known as abfraction. Abfraction is a type of noncarious cervical lesion (NCCL) characterized by loss of tooth tissues with different clinical appearances. Particularly, the cervical wear of abfraction can occur as a result of normal and abnormal tooth function and may also be accompanied by pathological wear, such as abrasion and erosion. During erosion, the cingulum is lost and the erosion is extended into the gingival crevice. In attrition, wear facets are seen on the cingulum and the cingulum shows compression pits consistent with wear in centric occlusion.

Malocclusion

The line of occlusion is a smooth curve passing through the central fossa of each upper molar and across the cingulum of the upper canine and incisor teeth. According to the British Standard Institution (BSI), malocclusion is classified based on how the lower incisor edges relate to the cingulum plateau of the upper incisors. In Class I, the lower incisor edges occlude with or lie immediately below the cingulum plateau of the upper central incisors. In Class II, the lower incisor edges lie posterior to the cingulum plateau of the upper incisors, and this category is subdivided into two divisions: Division 1, where the upper central incisors are proclined or have average inclination, accompanied by an increase in overjet, and Division 2, where the upper central incisors are retroclined, with a minimal or occasionally increased overjet. In Class III, the lower incisor edges lie anterior to the cingulum plateau of the upper incisors, resulting in a reduced or reversed overjet.

== Cingulum in different teeth ==
Maxillary incisor

The lingual contour of the cervical line is located beneath a smooth, rounded elevation known as the cingulum and has a shape similar to the labial cervical line. The cingulum is positioned in the cervical third of the lingual surface. On either side of the cingulum are the mesial and distal marginal ridges, which extend from the incisal ridge. Below the cingulum lies a shallow depression called the lingual fossa, which is bordered mesially by the mesial marginal ridge, incisally by the lingual portion of the incisal ridge, distally by the distal marginal ridge, and cervically by the cingulum. Developmental grooves emerge from the cingulum and extend into the lingual fossa.

Mandibular incisor

The lingual surface is smooth, featuring a concavity in the incisal third between the marginal ridges. In some cases, the marginal ridges are more pronounced near the incisal edge, making the concavity more defined. The lingual surface is relatively flat in the incisal third and convex in the cervical third. The cingulum does not display any developmental grooves.

Maxillary and mandibular canines

The lingual surface of the crown is narrower than the labial surface and features a prominent cingulum, which may resemble a small cusp. In this morphological variation, the ridges and developmental grooves on the lingual surface are well-defined. The marginal ridges converge and connect with the cingulum, and in some cases, a distinct lingual ridge extends from the cusp tip toward the cingulum. Between this lingual ridge and the marginal ridges, shallow depressions known as the mesial and distal lingual fossae are visible. In other instances, the lingual surface appears smooth, making the fossae and ridges difficult to distinguish.

Maxillary vs mandibular incisors

Maxillary incisors have a cingulum that is more prominent compared to that of mandibular incisors. This cingulum, which appears as a noticeable bulge on the lingual surface near the cervical region of the tooth, is a distinguishing characteristic of maxillary incisors. In certain cases, the marginal ridges of maxillary incisors may present a more rounded appearance. Additionally, some maxillary incisors may feature a small depression, known as a cingulum pit, within this region. The combination of these rounded marginal ridges along with the presence of a cingulum pit contributes to the formation of a distinct anatomical shape, often referred to as a "shovel shape".

Maxillary vs mandibular canines

The cingulum of the maxillary teeth, which appears as a prominent bulge on the lingual surface near the cervical region of the tooth, is generally more pronounced and substantial compared to the cingulum found in mandibular teeth. This distinction is particularly noticeable in permanent canines, where the maxillary cingulum stands out as a well-defined structure. In most cases, a maxillary canine exhibits a central ridge that extends from the cingulum all the way to the cusp. This ridge serves as a reinforcement, adding structural strength to the tooth and contributing to its overall morphology.

== Clinical importance in dentistry ==
The cingulum plays a crucial role in maintaining the structural integrity of a tooth by providing resistance against lingual forces exerted during mastication. Preserving the cingulum during tooth preparation for crowns helps maintain this natural resistance, thereby enhancing the longevity, stability, and functionality of the restoration. Retaining the cingulum ensures that occlusal forces are properly distributed, reducing stress on the underlying tooth structure and improving the overall success of crown placement.

Orthodontics

In orthodontic treatment, the morphology of the cingulum significantly influences bracket positioning and treatment outcomes. Accurate placement of brackets is essential for achieving proper occlusal relationships and aesthetic alignment, as misalignment can result in undesirable tooth movement affecting both function and appearance. Additionally, the vertical positioning of brackets impacts the torque exerted on a tooth, which can alter the effectiveness of applied orthodontic forces and influence the overall biomechanics of tooth movement. Given these factors, a thorough understanding of the cingulum’s anatomy is essential for orthodontists to ensure precise treatment planning and successful therapeutic outcomes.

Prosthodontics

In prosthodontics, particularly in removable partial dentures (RPDs), the cingulum serves as a strategic site for rest seat placement. A cingulum rest is a concave preparation made on the lingual surface of an anterior tooth, designed to provide vertical support for the denture framework. These rests are commonly placed on canines due to their strong root structure but can also be adapted for incisors when adequately designed. Cingulum rests fabricated with bonded composite resin have been shown to effectively distribute occlusal forces and prevent the tissue ward movement of the prosthesis. Longitudinal clinical studies have demonstrated that these rest seats do not cause significant periodontal damage, underscoring their biocompatibility and functional benefits. Incorporating cingulum rests into RPD design improves the prosthesis's stability, enhances patient comfort, and contributes to the long-term preservation of oral structures.

A case summary reveals that a 55-year-old male presented with chewing difficulties due to ill-fitting maxillary dentures and an unstable bridge. To restore function and stability, a new upper removable partial denture (RPD) was fabricated, incorporating a palatal plate, Akers clasps, and a cingulum rest on the left canine for additional support. The cingulum rest, strategically placed on the lingual surface of the left canine, functioned as a direct retainer, enhancing denture stability by minimizing movement during chewing and evenly distributing occlusal forces. This design reduced strain on the surrounding soft tissues and improved prosthesis retention. In combination with occlusal rests and well-structured connectors, the cingulum rest facilitated proper insertion and removal of the RPD, ensuring long-term comfort and functionality. A 10-year follow-up confirmed the success of this prosthetic intervention, demonstrating the effectiveness of incorporating cingulum rests in RPD design to enhance durability and patient satisfaction.

Forensic Dentistry

In forensic dentistry, the cingulum serves as a valuable morphological feature for dental identification. Since the size, shape, and prominence of the cingulum vary among individuals, it can aid in the comparison of ante-mortem and post-mortem dental records in forensic investigations. In forensic casework, orthodontic records—including photographs, radiographs, and dental casts—can be used to match dental features to a missing person or unidentified body. The presence and shape of the cingulum, particularly in individuals with orthodontic appliances, can serve as a distinguishing characteristic. In a documented case from Brazil, forensic investigators successfully identified a decomposed body by analyzing the orthodontic brackets and distinctive anatomical features of the incisors and canines, including the cingulum, through ante-mortem and post-mortem radiographic comparisons.

Furthermore, variations in cingulum morphology can aid in bite mark analysis, a crucial aspect of forensic dentistry. When bite marks are found on a victim’s skin or an object, forensic odontologists analyze the incisal edges and lingual contours of the anterior teeth, including the cingulum, to match them with a suspect’s dental profile. This technique has been instrumental in forensic investigations, linking suspects to crime scenes through detailed bite mark comparisons.
