= List of diseases (T) =

This is a list of diseases starting with the letter "T".

== T–Tc ==
- Tachycardia
- Taeniasis
- Takayasu arteritis
- Talipes equinovarus
- Tamari–Goodman syndrome
- Tang Hsi Ryu syndrome
- Tangier disease
- TAR syndrome
- Tardive dyskinesia
- Tarsal tunnel syndrome
- Taste disorder
- Tatton-Brown–Rahman syndrome
- TAU syndrome
- Taurodontia absent teeth sparse hair
- Taurodontism
- Tay syndrome ichthyosis
- Taybi–Linder syndrome
- Taybi syndrome
- Tay–Sachs disease
- T-cell lymphoma

== Te ==
=== Tee–Ten ===
- Teebi–Kaurah syndrome
- Teebi–Naguib–Alawadi syndrome
- Teebi–Shaltout syndrome
- Teebi syndrome
- Teeth noneruption of with maxillary hypoplasia and genu valgum
- Tel Hashomer camptodactyly syndrome
- Telangiectasia ataxia variant V1
- Telangiectasia, hereditary hemorrhagic
- Telangiectasia
- Telecanthus hypertelorism pes cavus
- Telecanthus with associated abnormalities
- Telencephalic leukoencephalopathy
- Telfer–Sugar–Jaeger syndrome
- Temporal epilepsy, familial
- Temporomandibular ankylosis
- Temporomandibular joint dysfunction (TMJ)
- Temtamy–Shalash syndrome
- TEN

=== Ter–Tet ===
- Ter Haar–Hamel–Hendricks syndrome
- Ter Haar syndrome
- Teratocarcinosarcoma
- Teratoma
- Testes neoplasm
- Testotoxicosis
- Tetanus
- Tethered spinal cord disease
- Tetraamelia ectodermal dysplasia
- Tetraamelia multiple malformations
- Tetraamelia pulmonary hypoplasia
- Tetraamelia-syrinx
- Tetrahydrobiopterin deficiency
- Tetraploidy
- Tetrasomy 9p
- Tetrasomy 15qter syndrome
- Tetrasomy X

== Th ==
=== Tha–Thi ===
- Thakker–Donnai syndrome
- Thalamic degeneration symmetrical infantile
- Thalamic degenerescence infantile
- Thalamic syndrome
- Thalassemia major
- Thalassemia minor
- Thalassemia
- Thanatophobia
- Thanatophoric dysplasia cloverleaf skull
- Thanatophoric dysplasia Glasgow variant
- Thanos–Stewart–Zonana syndrome
- Theodor–Hertz–Goodman syndrome
- Thiele syndrome
- Thiemann epiphyseal disease
- Thies–Reis syndrome
- Thin ribs tubular bones dysmorphism
- Thiolase deficiency
- Thiopurine S methyltranferase deficiency

=== Tho ===
- Thomas–Jewett–Raines syndrome
- Thomas syndrome
- Thombocytopenia X linked
- Thompson–Baraitser syndrome
- Thong–Douglas–Ferrante syndrome
- Thoracic celosomia
- Thoracic dysplasia-hydrocephalus syndrome
- Thoracic outlet syndrome
- Thoraco abdominal enteric duplication
- Thoraco limb dysplasia Rivera type
- Thoracolaryngopelvic dysplasia
- Thoracopelvic dysostosis
- Thost–Unna palmoplantar keratoderma

=== Thr–Thu ===
- Thrombasthenia
- Thrombocytopathy asplenia miosis
- Thrombocytopathy
- Thrombocytopenia cerebellar hypoplasia short stature
- Thrombocytopenia chromosome breakage
- Thrombocytopenia multiple congenital anomaly
- Thrombocytopenia purpura
- Thrombocytopenia Robin sequence
- Thrombocytopenia
- Thrombocytopenic purpura, autoimmune
- Thrombocytosis
- Thrombomodulin anomalies, familial
- Thrombotic microangiopathy, familial
- Thrush
- Thumb absence hypoplastic halluces
- Thumb absent short stature immune deficiency
- Thumb deformity, alopecia, pigmentation anomaly
- Thumb deformity
- Thumb stiff brachydactyly mental retardation

=== Thy ===
- Thymic carcinoma
- Thymic epithelial tumor
- Thymic renal anal lung dysplasia
- Thymoma
- Thymus neoplasm
- Thyrocerebrorenal syndrome
- Thyroglossal tract cyst
- Thyroid agenesis
- Thyroid cancer
- Thyroid carcinoma, follicular
- Thyroid carcinoma, papillary (TPC)
- Thyroid hormone plasma membrane transport defect
- Thyroid, renal and digital anomalies

== Ti–Tn ==
- Tibia absent polydactyly arachnoid cyst
- Tibiae bowed radial anomalies osteopenia fracture
- Tibial aplasia ectrodactyly hydrocephalus
- Tibial aplasia ectrodactyly
- Tibial hemimelia cleft lip palate
- Tick paralysis
- Tick-borne encephalitis
- Tièche–Jadassohn nevus
- Tietz syndrome
- Tinnitus
- T-Lymphocytopenia
- TNF receptor associated periodic syndrome (TRAPS)

== To ==
=== Tod–Tot ===
- Todd's paralysis
- Todd's syndrome
- Togaviridae disease
- Tollner–Horst–Manzke syndrome
- Tolosa–Hunt syndrome
- Toluene antenatal infection
- Tomaculous neuropathy
- Tome–Brune–Fardeau syndrome
- Tongue neoplasm
- Toni–Debre–Fanconi maladie
- Toni–Fanconi syndrome
- Tonsillitis
- TORCH syndrome
- Toriello–Carey syndrome
- Toriello–Lacassie–Droste syndrome
- Toriello syndrome
- Toriello–Higgins–Miller syndrome
- Torres–Ayber syndrome
- Torsades de pointes
- Torsion dystonia 7
- Torticollis
- Torticollis keloids cryptorchidism renal dysplasia
- Torulopsis
- Tosti–Misciali–Barbareschi syndrome
- Total hypotrichosis, Mari type

=== Tou–Tox ===
- Touraine–Solente–Golé syndrome
- Tourette syndrome
- Townes–Brocks syndrome
- Toxic conjunctivitis
- Toxic shock syndrome
- Toxocariasis
- Toxopachyoteose diaphysaire tibio peroniere
- Toxoplasmosis

- Toxoplasmosis, congenital

== Tr ==
=== Tra ===
- Tracheal agenesis
- Tracheobronchomalacia
- Tracheobronchomegaly
- Tracheobronchopathia osteoplastica
- Tracheoesophageal fistula symphalangism
- Tracheoesophageal fistula
- Tracheophageal fistula hypospadias
- Trachoma
- Tranebjaerg–Svejgaard syndrome
- Transcobalamin II deficiency
- Transient erythroblastopenia of childhood
- Transient global amnesia
- Transient neonatal arthrogryposis
- Transitional cell carcinoma
- Transplacental infections
- Transposition of great vessels
- Transverse limb deficiency hemangioma
- Transverse myelitis
- TRAPS

=== Tre ===
- Treacher Collins syndrome
- Treft–Sanborn–Carey syndrome
- Tremor hereditary essential
- Treponema infection
- Trevor disease

=== Tri ===
- Trisomy 13

==== Tria ====
- Triatrial heart

==== Tric ====
- Trichinellosis
- Trichinosis
- Tricho–dento–osseous syndrome type 1
- Tricho odonto onycho dermal syndrome
- Tricho odonto onychodysplasia syndactyly dominant type
- Tricho onychic dysplasia
- Tricho onycho hypohidrotic dysplasia
- Tricho retino dento digital syndrome
- Trichodental syndrome
- Tricho–dento–osseous syndrome
- Trichodermodysplasia dental alterations
- Trichodysplasia xeroderma
- Trichoepithelioma multiple familial
- Trichofolliculloma
- Tricho-hepato-enteric syndrome
- Trichomalacia
- Trichomegaly cataract hereditary spherocytosis
- Trichomegaly-retina pigmentary degeneration-dwarfism syndrome
- Trichomoniasis
- Trichoodontoonychial dysplasia
- Trichorhinophalangeal syndrome type I
- Trichorhinophalangeal syndrome type II
- Trichorhinophalangeal syndrome type III
- Trichostasis spinulosa
- Trichothiodystrophy sun sensitivity
- Trichothiodystrophy
- Trichotillomania
- Tricuspid atresia
- Tricuspid dysplasia
- Tricyclic antidepressant overdose

==== Trig–Trip ====
- Trigeminal neuralgia
- Trigger finger
- Trigonocephaly
- Trigonocephaly bifid nose acral anomalies
- Trigonocephaly broad thumbs
- Trigonocephaly ptosis coloboma
- Trigonocephaly ptosis mental retardation
- Trigonomacrocephaly tibial defect polydactyly
- Trihydroxycholestanoylcoa oxidase isolated deficiency
- Trimethadione antenatal infection
- Trimethylaminuria
- Triopia
- Triosephosphate isomerase deficiency
- Triphalangeal thumb non opposable
- Triphalangeal thumb polysyndactyly syndrome
- Triphalangeal thumbs brachyectrodactyly
- Triple A syndrome
- Triplo X Syndrome
- Triploid Syndrome
- Triploidy

==== Tris ====
- Trismus pseudocamptodactyly syndrome
- Trisomy 1 mosaicism
- Trisomy 11 mosaicism
- Trisomy 12 mosaicism
- Trisomy 14 mosaicism
- Trisomy 2 mosaicism
- Trisomy 3 mosaicism
- Trisomy 6
- Trisomy

=== Tro–Try ===
- Trochlear dysplasia
- Trophoblastic Neoplasms (gestational trophoblastic disease)
- Trophoblastic tumor
- Tropical spastic paraparesis
- Tropical sprue
- Troyer syndrome
- Trueb–Burg–Bottani syndrome
- Trypanophobia
- Trypanosomiasis, East African
- Trypanosomiasis, West African

== Ts ==
- Tsao–Ellingson syndrome
- Tsukahara–Azuno–Kajii syndrome
- Tsukahara–Kajii syndrome
- Tsukuhara syndrome

== Tu–Tw ==
- Tuberculosis, pulmonary
- Tuberculosis
- Tuberculous meningitis
- Tuberculous uveitis
- Tuberous Sclerosis

- Tuberous Sclerosis, type 1
- Tuberous Sclerosis, type 2

- Tucker syndrome
- Tuffli–Laxova syndrome
- Tufted angioma
- Tularemia
- Tungiasis
- Tunglang–Savage–Bellman syndrome
- Turcot syndrome
- Turner–Kieser syndrome
- Turner–Morgani–Albright
- Turner-like syndrome
- Turner's syndrome
- Tutuncuoglu syndrome
- Twin-to-twin transfusion syndrome

== Ty–Tz ==
- Typhoid
- Typhus
- Tyrosinemia
- Tyrosine-oxidase temporary deficiency
