= Tracheal agenesis =

Congenital disorder of respiratory system

- Other names: Congenital tracheal agenesis
- Complications: Other congenital malformations
- Causes: Unknown

Tracheal agenesis (also known as tracheal atresia) is a rare birth defect with a prevalence of less than 1 in 50,000 in which the trachea fails to develop, resulting in an impaired communication between the larynx and the alveoli of the lungs. Although the defect is normally fatal, occasional cases have been reported of long-term survival following surgical intervention.

The disease was first described in 1900 by Payne. To this date, it is estimated that about 200 cases have been reported and published worldwide. Several types of the disease have been described and the slight anatomical variations have resulted in the establishment of different classification systems. There are three main types of tracheal agenesis, designated Types I, II and III.

In 2013, a South Korean child, Hannah Warren, born with tracheal agenesis, was successfully treated at Children's Hospital of Illinois, after having been kept alive in an intensive care unit for the first two and a half years of her life. An artificially created trachea was implanted, that had been created by tissue engineering, by using a nanofiber mesh, coated with her own stem cells. Although the transplant was successful, she died three months later from other health issues.

The disease has been more frequently observed in males than in females, at a ratio of 2:1.

== Signs and symptoms ==
Observable signs and symptoms of the disease differ depending on whether the observation in done in utero or after parturition. Only the signs and symptoms of the embryo are described, due to the lack of research in maternal symptoms.

=== In utero ===
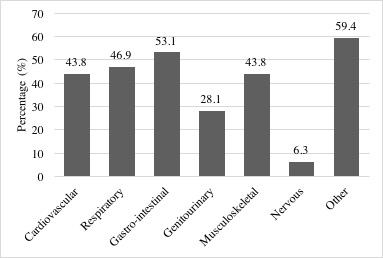
Incidence of congenital malformations associated with tracheal agenesis. Results were obtained from a total of 32 individual case studies.

The classic in-utero symptoms of tracheal agenesis are an absence of the trachea leading to congenital high airway obstruction syndrome, lung distention, polyhydramnios, heart malformations, heart displacement and hydrops fetalis. Other congenital malformations such as genitourinary, gastrointestinal and musculoskeletal anomalies are common and occur in 80% of the reported cases.

Tracheal agenesis may lead to a distention of the foetus’ lung due to a build-up of pulmonary fluid within them. In this case, ultrasound scans show bilaterally enlarged and homogeneously echogenic lungs as well as the inversion of both hemidiaphragms. Although lung distention has been described as a classic symptom, hypoplasia or complete aplasia of the lungs can also occur, in an estimated 26% of cases. In some cases, normal lung development was also reported in neonates with tracheal agenesis.

The abnormal development of the foetus’ lungs leads to cardiovascular abnormalities. Distention of the lungs results in a compressed and displaced heart, hindering the normal growth and development of the organ. Depending on the severity of the compression of the heart, normal venous return to the organ would correspondingly be hindered, resulting in a condition known as hydrops fetalis (also known as fetalis ascites), in which oedema form in the developing foetus. Hydrops fetalis can be observed in utero via ultrasound scan.

Polyhydramnios occurs in embryos presenting with a tracheoesophageal fistula as the liquid produced by the lungs supposedly pass to the stomach, in the amniotic fluid.

=== At birth ===
More than half of the recorded cases of tracheal agenesis have led to premature deliveries and in almost all reported cases, infants die shortly after birth due to lack of oxygenation. Neonates with tracheal agenesis present with symptoms characteristic to congenital high airway obstruction syndrome with no audible cry after birth, respiratory insufficiency, respiratory distress and cyanosis. No trachea is palpable below the cricoid cartilage.

== Causes ==
The exact causes of tracheal agenesis remain unknown. Different embryological theories have arisen to explain the congenital development of the disease.

=== Embryological causes ===
The relative similarities between the different subtypes of the disease suggest that there is a common stage at which the development is hindered.

In normal embryogenesis, the trachea differentiates from the foregut during the fourth week of gestation. The respiratory diverticulum, a ventral projection formed from the foregut, appears. Eventually, the tracheoesophageal ridges will fuse to form a septum. The laryngotracheal tube will then fully separate from the foregut. Two primary bronchial buds form at the end of the tube, which then elongates to form the trachea. The buds then branch to form the bronchi, lungs and alveolar tissue. The development of the respiratory tract is closely associated to that of the oesophagus. Both organs regulate each other’s growth via molecular interactions.

In tracheal agenesis, a delay in the development of the primary bronchial buds causes a transient arrest in the growth of the laryngotracheal tube, hindering the normal development of the trachea. The failure of the lung buds to develop from the primitive foregut leads to tracheoesophageal malformations. The development of the buds occurs after the elongation of the oesophagus, causing a dissociation in the growth of the two organs. Due to this dissociation, the buds directly develop to form the lungs, without forming the trachea, resulting in tracheal agenesis. Different degrees of this malformation result in different types of tracheal agenesis.

=== Genetic determinants ===
No clear genetic pattern or karyotype has been established to support the development of tracheal agenesis. The genes that have been postulated to influence the development of the disease are all associated to the congenital development of the lungs, trachea and oesophagus. These are BMP-4, BMPR1A and BMPR1B, Gli2 and Gli3, sonic hedgehog and NK2 homeobox 1. It is highly likely that tracheal agenesis results from the mutation of several of these genes.

BMP-4 is an important signalling molecule in the early development of the embryo. BMP-4 null mutations in the foregut endoderm and in its surrounding mesoderm results in atresia of the trachea and under developed lungs. The Bmp family restricts the site of formation of lung buds as well as to induce cell proliferation via the suppression of Sox2.

Gli2 and Gli3 null mutations were also found to result in delayed lung, tracheal and oesophageal development. The two signalling molecules are implicated in the mediation of Sonic hedgehog signalling, which regulates the proliferation and differentiation of the oesophagus, trachea and lungs.

In mice, NK2 homeobox 1 null mutation results in a significantly shorter trachea, connected to the oesophagus via a tracheoesophageal fistula. In embryos with a homozygous mutated NK2 homeobox 1 locus, the tracheoesophageal ridges fail to fuse and form a septum.

== Diagnosis ==
The diagnosis of the disease is dependent on observable signs and symptoms and on the stage of gestation. There are two ways to diagnose tracheal agenesis: early in utero, or later at birth. Recognisable clinical patterns are associated with tracheal agenesis.

Most commonly, the in-utero diagnosis of the disease requires using radiography and ultrasound scans.

At birth, the diagnosis is suspected clinically through the observations of characteristic signs and symptoms of the disease. Tracheal agenesis should be suspected when tracheal intubation is impossible. The confirmation of the diagnosis relies on results of endoscopic laryngoscopies and oesophagoscopies at birth. X-ray studies are necessary to determine the class and the severity of the disease. CT scans remain an option to provide more information if required.

=== Classification ===
Tracheal agenesis is classified according to anatomical subtypes. Different classifications exist but the universally accepted one, by Floyd and colleagues in 1962, distinguishes three anatomical subtypes: type I, II and III.

==== Type I ====
Type I is described as tracheal atresia, rather than tracheal agenesis. The trachea is absent proximally but there remains a short normal segment of the distal trachea. A tracheoesophageal fistula links the distal segment of the proto trachea to the oesophagus. It is estimated that 13% of cases of the disease are of type I.

==== Type II ====
Type II tracheal agenesis is the most common form of the disease, estimated to appear in 60% of cases. Type II is characterised by a complete absence of the trachea. The bronchi are normal and fuse at the carina. In most cases, the oesophagus and the carina are joined by a fistula.

==== Type III ====
In type III tracheal agenesis, the trachea is completely absent and the bronchi develop individually, originating from the oesophagus directly and without joining at the carina. No tracheoesophageal fistula is present in this case as the trachea is completely absent. It is estimated that 27% of all cases are type III.

==== Other classifications ====
In 1979, Faro described seven types of tracheal agenesis (A-G). This classification system differs from Floyd’s early propositions as it encompasses a more detailed description of the disease, including the surrounding organs such as the larynx and the lungs. The importance of this more detailed classification system is that the presence of surrounding organs, such as the larynx, might alter the observed symptoms of the traditionally defined tracheal agenesis. For example, neonates with a larynx might emit a faint cry at birth, while those with complete agenesis of the trachea and of the larynx will not. Acknowledging these different anatomical subtypes allows for a more comprehensive diagnosis and better management of the disease.

Faro type A describes a total pulmonary agenesis, in which none of the respiratory organs are present. Type B is comparable to Floyd’s type III and describes complete agenesis of the trachea, with no joining of the bronchi. Faro type C describes total agenesis of the trachea with normal bronchi fusing at the carina. A tracheoesophageal fistula is present and links the carina to the oesophagus. In Faro type D, the larynx is joined to the distal trachea and a tracheoesophageal fistula links the carina to the oesophagus. Faro type E is comparable to Floyd’s type I, as the distal trachea is present and joined to the oesophagus via a fistula. Faro type F describes the proximal absence of the trachea but the normal presence of the distal trachea. In this case, the trachea is not attached to the oesophagus. In Faro type G, a segment of the trachea is absent, defining it as partial tracheal agenesis.

== Management ==
In patients with tracheal agenesis, surgical correction is required to allow for a relatively temporary survival of the neonate. Tracheal intubation is proven to be impossible in almost all cases. In most cases, if surgery is unsuccessful, severe asphyxia results in the death of the neonate, on average two days after birth. The longest survival ever reported was six years.

== See also ==
Children's Hospital of Illinois Transplant surgery on Hannah Warren
