= Lung bud =

Embryological precursor of the respiratory system

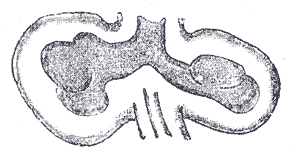
- Bronchial buds from a human embryo of about four weeks, showing commencing lobulations.

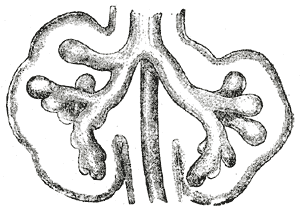
- Lungs of a human embryo at about six weeks

Details
- Days: 28
- Precursor: Ventral part of the foregut
- Gives rise to: Lower respiratory tract
- System: Respiratory system

Identifiers
- Latin: gemma pulmonalis, gemma respiratoria
- TE: bud_by_E5.5.3.0.0.0.3 E5.5.3.0.0.0.3

The lung bud sometimes referred to as the respiratory bud forms from the respiratory diverticulum, an embryological endodermal structure that develops into the respiratory tract organs such as the larynx, trachea, bronchi and lungs. It arises from part of the laryngotracheal tube.

== Early stage ==
In the fourth week of human embryonic development, the respiratory diverticulum, starts to grow from the ventral (front) side of the foregut into the mesoderm that surrounds it, forming the lung bud. Around the 28th day, during the separation of the lung bud from the foregut it forms the trachea and splits into two bronchial buds, one on each side.

=== Molecular signaling ===
The molecular signaling involved in the specification of the respiratory bud starts with the expression of the Nkx2-1 gene, which determines the respiratory field – the area where the respiratory bud will begin to grow from. The signaling that makes the growth of the respiratory bud possible is complex and involves a number of interactions between the mesoderm and the respiratory bud epithelium, in which members of the Fgf and Fgfr family of genes express.

=== Separation of trachea and esophagus ===
At first, the posterior part of the trachea is open to the esophagus, but as the bud elongates two longitudinal mesodermal ridges known as the laryngotracheal folds, begin to form and grow until they join, forming a wall between the two organs. An incomplete separation of the organs leads to a congenital abnormality known as a tracheoesophageal fistula.

=== Larynx development ===
The epithelium of the larynx is of endodermal origin, but the laryngeal cartilages, unlike the rest of the respiratory bud connective tissue, come from the mesenchyme of the fourth and sixth pharyngeal arches. The fourth pharyngeal arch, adjacent to what will be the root of the tongue, will become the epiglottis. The sixth pharyngeal arch, located around the laryngeal orifice, will become the thyroid, cricoid and arytenoid cartilages. These structures are formed in a process in which the lining cells of the primitive larynx proliferate and occlude it. Later, it recanalizes leaving two membrane-like structures: the vocal folds and the vestibular folds. In between, an enlarged space, the ventricle, remains. Failure in this process leads to a serious but rare condition called congenital atresia of the larynx.

== Later development ==
After the lung buds have formed, they begin to grow and branch forming a primitive version of the bronchial tree, determining how the lobes of the lung will be arranged in the mature organ. The first stage of alveolar development, spanning between the fifth and the 16th week of development, is called the pseudoglandular stage. It is so called because of the histological appearance of the primitive alveoli, which resemble glandular tissue. After the pseudoglandular stage, the lung enters the canalicular and saccular phases. During these stages, the terminal tubes narrow and give rise to small saccules, which become increasingly associated with capillaries as to make gas exchange possible. The alveolar epithelium begins to differentiate into two distinct types of cells: type I pneumocytes and type II pneumocytes, as well as the respiratory epithelium of the trachea and bronchial tree.
