= Andrew Oliver (New Zealander) =

Oldest known person with Fryns–Aftimos syndrome

Andy Oliver
- Oliver in 2019
- Born: 1983 or 1984
- Died: 16 July 2025 (aged 41); Waikato Hospital, Hamilton, New Zealand
- Known for: Being the only known New Zealander diagnosed with Fryns–Aftimos syndrome, and the oldest known person to have survived with the condition

Andrew Francis Oliver (c. 1984 – 16 July 2025) was a New Zealander who came to prominence due to his relationship with milk tank trucks that visited his property. Oliver was the only known person in New Zealand diagnosed with Fryns–Aftimos syndrome, and he was the oldest known person to have survived with the condition.

== Biography ==
Andrew Francis Oliver was born to Ken and Deirdre Oliver. Scans during pregnancy indicated that he would be born with deformities, and doctors recommended terminating the pregnancy. His parents decided against this due to their views around the sanctity of life, informed by their Christian faith and involvement with The Salvation Army. Oliver was born with a swollen head and neck; while he was described from research by Jean-Pierre Fryns and Salim Aftimos, who proposed another name of the syndrome

As an infant, Oliver was diagnosed with Langer–Giedion syndrome. During his childhood he underwent multiple surgeries and developed epilepsy. By the time he was six years old, his mother had begun to doubt that his original diagnosis was correct. He was eventually diagnosed with Fryns–Aftimos syndrome, an extremely rare chromosomal disorder. Oliver was the only person to be diagnosed with the syndrome in New Zealand, and at 35 he was the oldest person in the world known to have it. Because of his condition, even at the age of 35 he had the mental capability of a six-year-old. Oliver was called "Andy" by those who knew him.

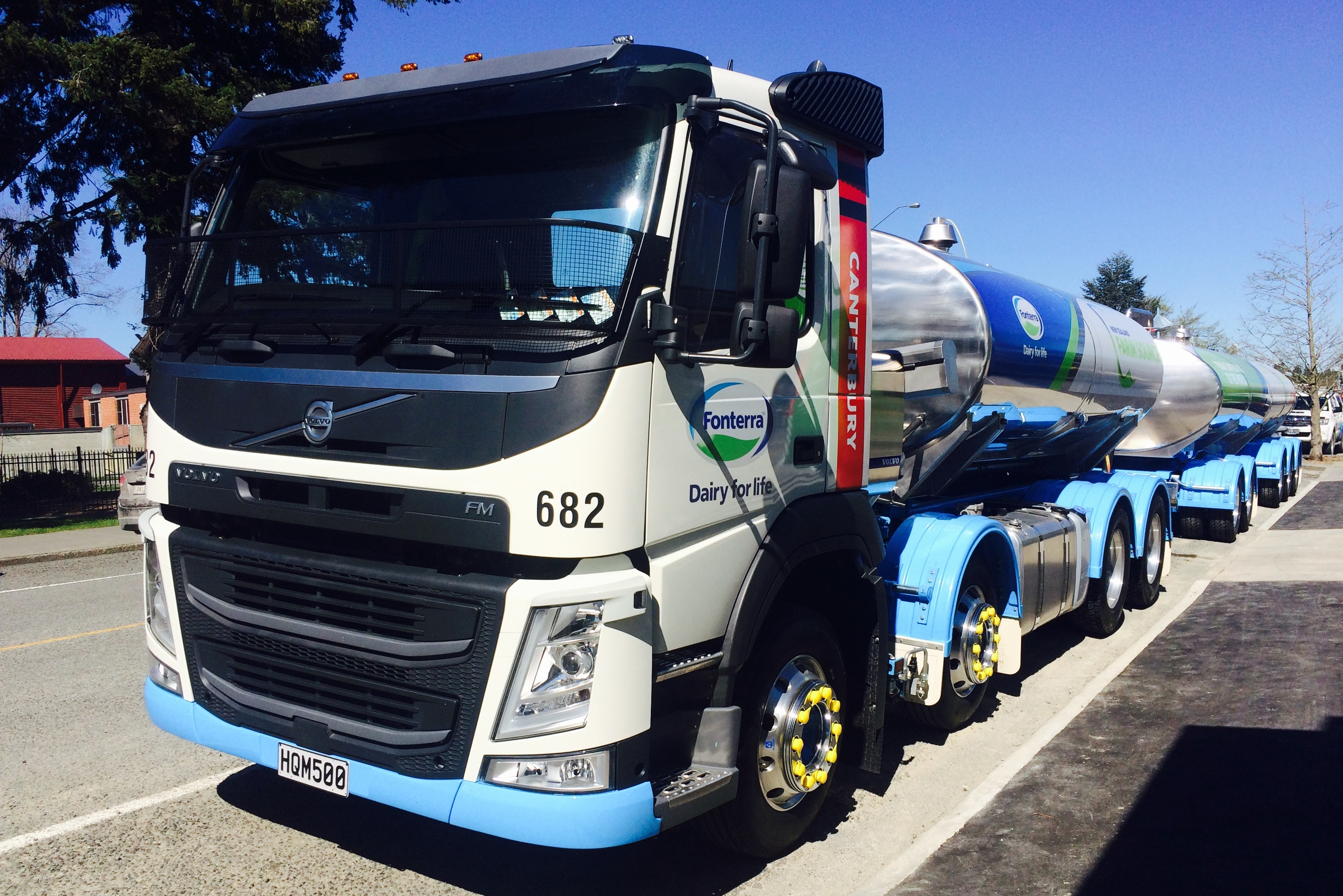
An example of a Fonterra tank truck

Oliver came to national attention in 2019, when news articles reported that the dairy co-operative Fonterra had adjusted its collection routine to help Oliver maintain a consistent bedtime. Oliver had a fixed routine that included greeting the tank trucks that collected milk from the farm where he lived in Te Rapa, near Hamilton. Initially, the collections occurred at erratic times as late as 2 am, and Oliver would not go to bed until he had seen the truck. After a request for help from Oliver's father, Fonterra adjusted its collection routine to guarantee a pickup between 6:30 pm and 8:00 pm. Fonterra gifted Oliver multiple items including a tricycle labeled "Fonterra No. 1 Fan" and a toy tank truck.

Due to the rarity of his condition, Oliver's family had difficulty accessing government support. In 2019, he joined a new independent living programme. On 16 July 2025, Oliver died of pneumonia at Waikato Hospital, at the age of 41. He was buried in a coffin printed with images of Fonterra milk tanker trucks.
