= NK2 homeobox 1 =

Mammalian protein found in Homo sapiens

NKX2-1
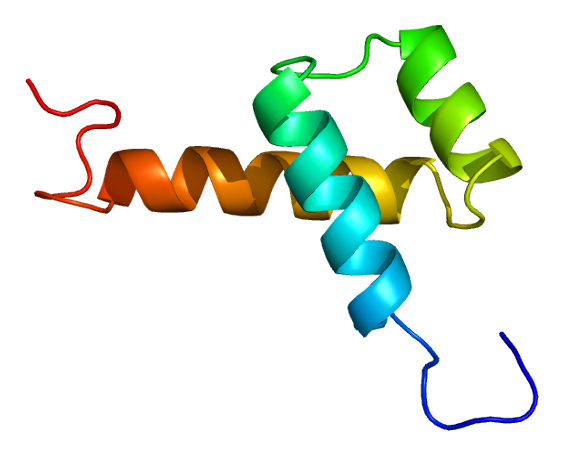

Identifiers
- Aliases: NKX2-1, Nkx2-1, AV026640, Nkx2.1, T/EBP, Titf1, Ttf-1, BCH, BHC, NK-2, NKX2A, TEBP, TTF1, NMTC1, NK2 homeobox 1
- External IDs: OMIM: 600635; MGI: 108067; GeneCards: NKX2-1

Gene location (Human)
Chr.	Chromosome 14 (human)
Band	14q13.3	Start	36,516,392 bp
Band	14q13.3	End	36,521,149 bp

Gene location (Mouse)
Chr.	Chromosome 12 (mouse)
Band	12 C1|12 24.42 cM	Start	56,578,743 bp
Band	12 C1|12 24.42 cM	End	56,583,693 bp
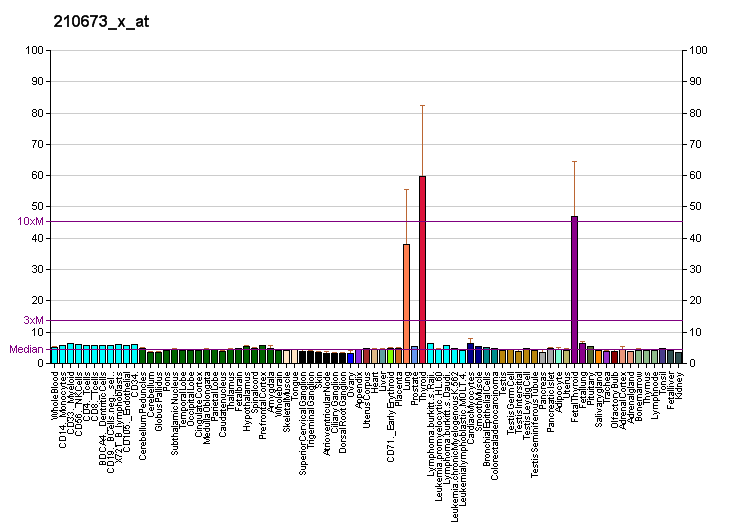

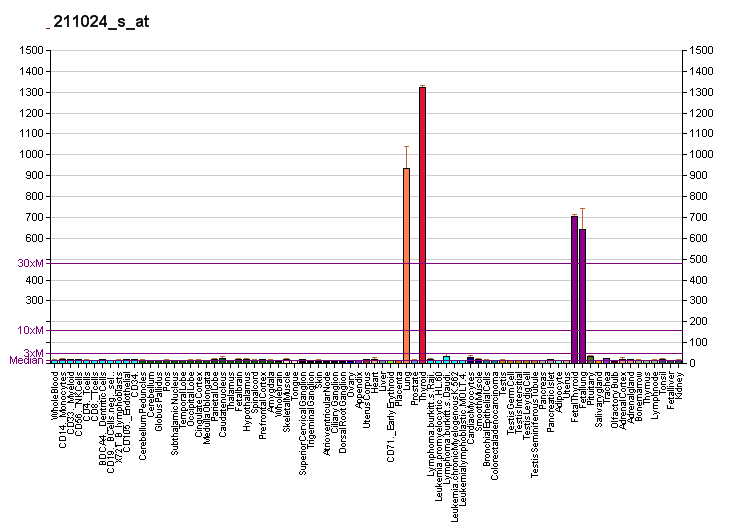
RNA expression pattern
Bgee	Human / Mouse (ortholog); Top expressed in: right lobe of thyroid gland; left lobe of thyroid gland; lower lobe of lung; right lung; upper lobe of lung; upper lobe of left lung; buccal mucosa cell; epithelium of bronchus; bronchial epithelial cell; visceral pleura / Top expressed in: thyroid gland; urethra; male urethra; hair; pituitary stalk; main bronchus; tongue; epithelium of trachea; left lung lobe; embryo; More reference expression data
BioGPS	More reference expression data
Gene ontology
Molecular function	DNA binding; sequence-specific DNA binding; protein binding; enzyme binding; RNA polymerase II transcription regulatory region sequence-specific DNA binding; intronic transcription regulatory region sequence-specific DNA binding; DNA-binding transcription factor activity; transcription factor activity, RNA polymerase II distal enhancer sequence-specific binding; DNA-binding transcription factor activity, RNA polymerase II-specific; RNA polymerase II cis-regulatory region sequence-specific DNA binding
Cellular component	nucleoplasm; nucleus; transcription regulator complex
Biological process	regulation of transcription, DNA-templated; rhythmic process; negative regulation of transforming growth factor beta receptor signaling pathway; transcription, DNA-templated; positive regulation of gene expression; negative regulation of cell migration; response to hormone; forebrain development; epithelial tube branching involved in lung morphogenesis; negative regulation of epithelial to mesenchymal transition; negative regulation of transcription by RNA polymerase II; neuron migration; regulation of transcription by RNA polymerase II; phospholipid metabolic process; pattern specification process; axon guidance; brain development; endoderm development; locomotory behavior; animal organ morphogenesis; telencephalon development; globus pallidus development; hippocampus development; cerebral cortex cell migration; forebrain dorsal/ventral pattern formation; forebrain neuron fate commitment; forebrain neuron differentiation; cerebral cortex GABAergic interneuron differentiation; cerebral cortex neuron differentiation; pituitary gland development; telencephalon cell migration; lung development; thyroid gland development; developmental induction; Leydig cell differentiation; positive regulation of circadian rhythm; negative regulation of transcription, DNA-templated; positive regulation of transcription, DNA-templated; positive regulation of transcription by RNA polymerase II; anatomical structure formation involved in morphogenesis; neuron fate commitment; oligodendrocyte differentiation; lung saccule development; club cell differentiation; type II pneumocyte differentiation; cell differentiation
Sources:Amigo / QuickGO
Orthologs
Databases	NCBI: entry; OMA: entry
Species	Human	Mouse
Entrez	7080	21869
Ensembl	ENSG00000136352	ENSMUSG00000001496
UniProt	P43699	P50220
RefSeq (mRNA)	NM_001079668; NM_003317	NM_001146198; NM_009385
RefSeq (protein)	NP_001073136; NP_003308	NP_033411; NP_001390509
Location (UCSC)	Chr 14: 36.52 – 36.52 Mb	Chr 12: 56.58 – 56.58 Mb
PubMed search
- Wikidata
View/Edit Human	View/Edit Mouse

NK2 homeobox 1 (NKX2-1), also known as thyroid transcription factor 1 (TTF-1), is a protein which in humans is encoded by the NKX2-1 gene.

== Function ==
Thyroid transcription factor-1 (TTF-1) is a protein that regulates transcription of genes specific for the thyroid, lung, and diencephalon. It is also known as thyroid specific enhancer binding protein. It is used in anatomic pathology as a marker to determine if a tumor arises from the lung or thyroid. NKX2.1 can be induced by activin A via SMAD2 signaling in a human embryonic stem cell differentiation model.

NKX2.1 is key to the fetal development of lung structures. The dorsal-ventral pattern of NKX2.1 expression forms the ventral boundary in the anterior foregut. NKX2.1 is expressed only in select cells in the ventral wall of the anterior foregut, and is not expressed in the dorsal wall, where the esophagus will emerge from.

== Knockout mice ==
NKX2.1 knockout in mice results in the development of a shortened trachea which is fused to the esophagus, with the bronchi directly connecting this shared tube to the lungs. This resembles a complete tracheoesophageal fistula, which is a rare congenital condition in humans. Distal lung structures do not develop in these knockout mice. Branching of the lungs in these mice did not occur past the main-stem bronchi, resulting in lungs that were smaller in size by about 50% compared to the wild-type mice. The epithelial lining of these distal structures did not show evidence of differentiation into specialized cells. This lining is composed of columnar epithelial cells and scattered ciliated epithelial cells. The proximal epithelium of the lungs showed normal differentiation, indicating that proximal differentiation is independent of NKX2.1. NKX2.1 is initially expressed in the entire epithelium, but is suppressed in a proximal-distal pattern as the lung continues to develop.

== Clinical significance ==
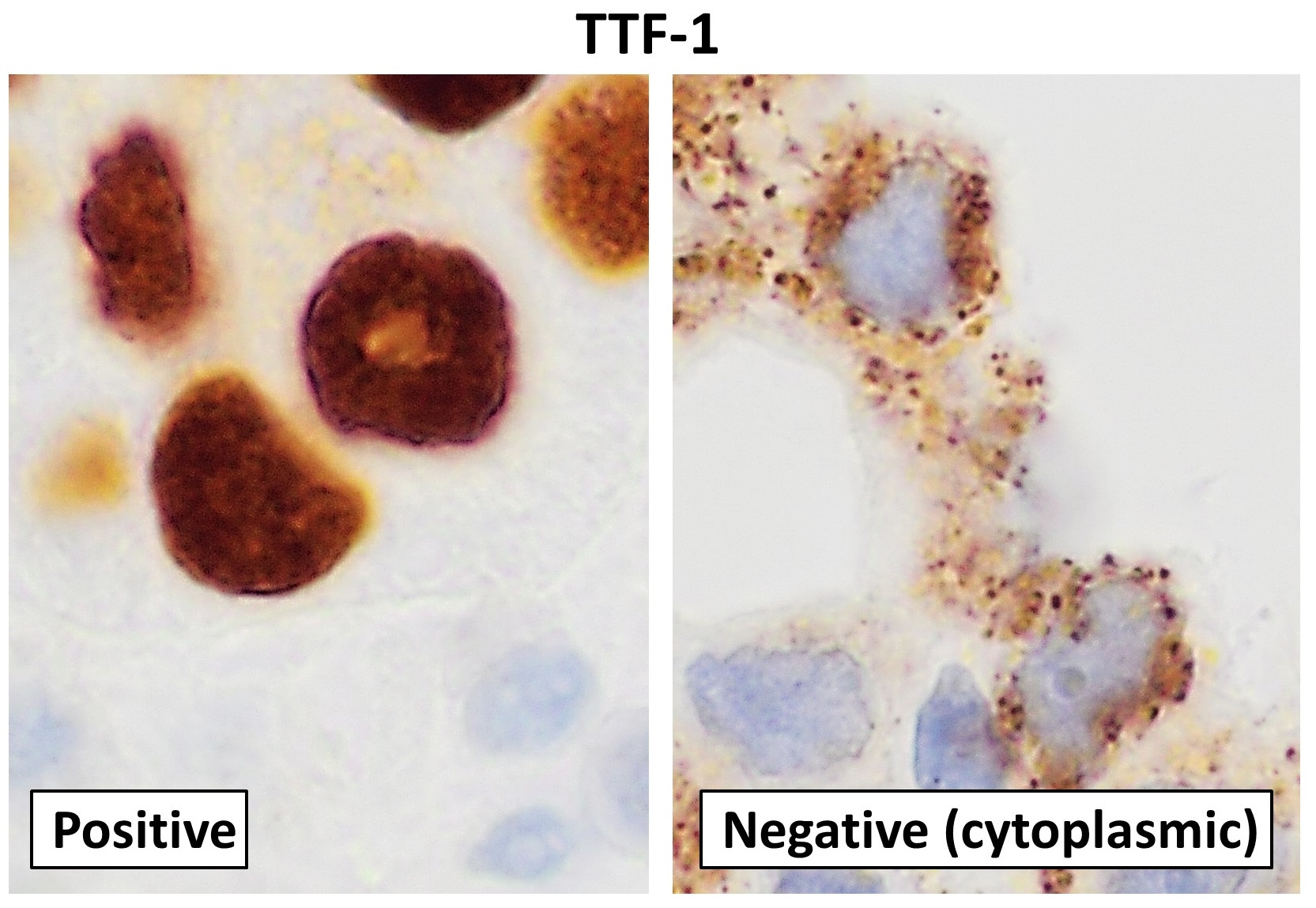
TTF-1 needs to have nuclear staining on immunohistochemistry to count as positive. Cytoplasmic staining is disregarded for diagnostic purposes.

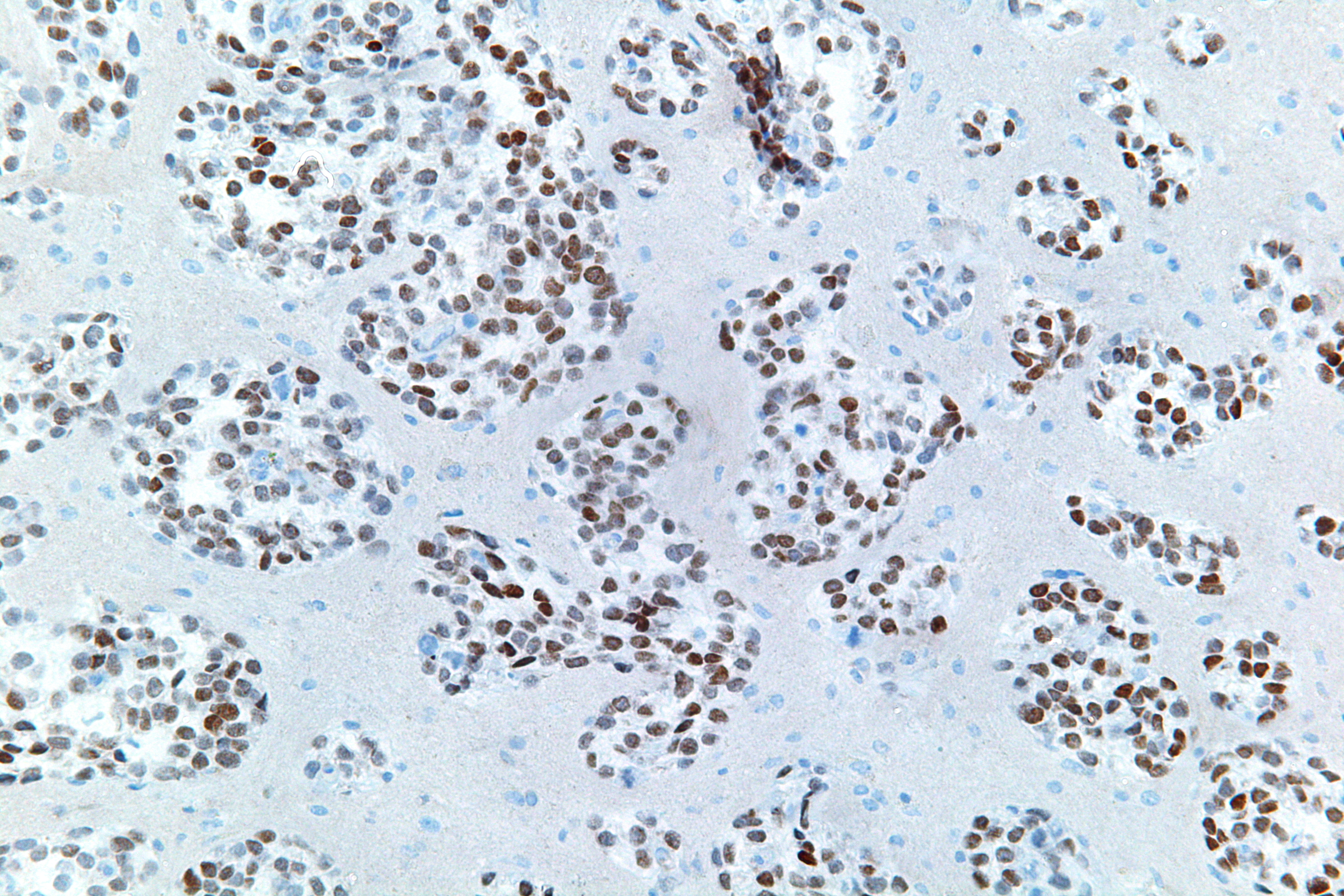
Micrograph of a metastatic lung adenocarcinoma (found in the brain) that exhibits nuclear staining (brown) for TTF-1.

TTF-1 positive cells are found in the lung as type II pneumocytes and club cells. In the thyroid, follicular and parafollicular cells are also positive for TTF-1.

For lung cancers, adenocarcinomas are usually positive, while squamous cell carcinomas and large cell carcinomas are rarely positive. Small cell carcinomas (of any primary site) are usually positive. TTF1 is more than merely a clinical marker of lung adenocarcinoma. It plays an active role in sustaining lung cancer cells in view of the experimental observation that it is mutated in lung cancer.

It has been observed that a loss of Nkx2-1 allows for deregulation of transcription factors FOXA1/2 (by relaxing histone deacetylation and methylation-mediated repression of Foxa1/2 by Nkx2-1) causing reactivation of an embryonic gastric differentiation program in pulmonary cells. This results in mucinous lung adenocarcinoma, a source of poor clinical outcomes for patients.

However others have found that TTF-1 staining is often positive in pulmonary adenocarcinomas, large cell carcinomas, small-cell lung carcinomas, neuroendocrine tumors other than small-cell lung carcinomas and extrapulmonary small-cell carcinomas.

It is also positive in thyroid cancers and is used for monitoring for metastasis and recurrence.

Elevated TTF-1 expression is correlated with improved clinical outcomes in KRAS^{G12C}-mutated non-small-cell lung cancer (NSCLC) in response to sotorasib treatment.

== Interactions ==
NK2 homeobox 1 has been shown to interact with calreticulin and PAX8.
