= Hyperdontia =

Condition of having extra teeth beyond the regular number of teeth

- Other names: Supernumerary teeth, Mesiodens
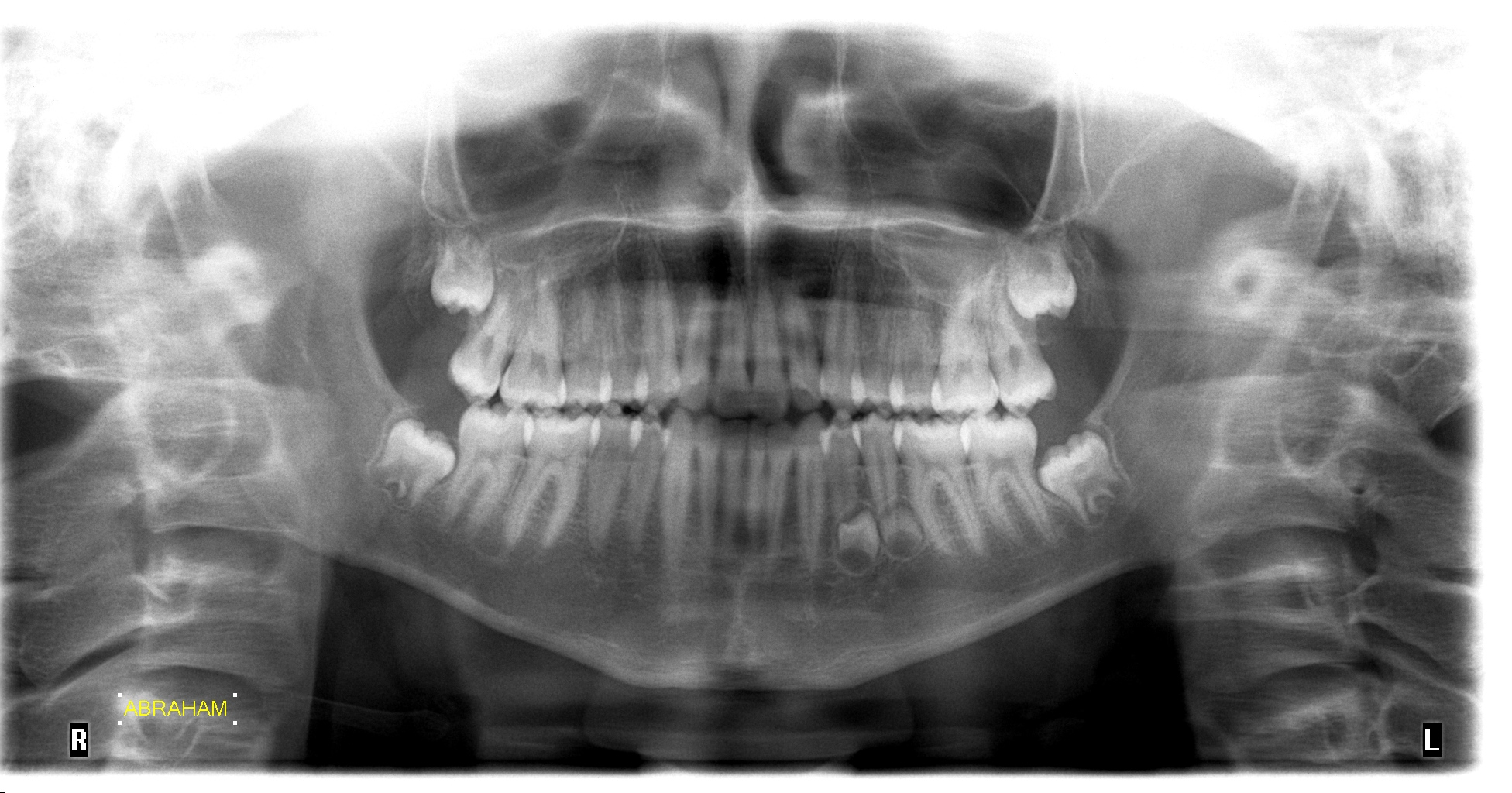
- Panoramic radiograph of human teeth, showing supernumerary teeth at the bottom right of the premolars
- Specialty: Dentistry
- Symptoms: Supernumerary teeth coming out from the gum or in the mouth
- Complications: Supernumerary teeth growing into the gum
- Types: 5
- Causes: Gardner's syndrome Ehlers-Danlos syndrome Cleft palate Cleidocranial dysplasia Genetic disorder
- Risk factors: supernumerary teeth causing problems in the dental arch
- Differential diagnosis: Hypodontia
- Treatment: Dental surgery

Hyperdontia is the condition of having supernumerary teeth, or teeth that appear in addition to the regular number of teeth (32 in the average adult). They can appear in any area of the dental arch and can affect any dental organ. The opposite of hyperdontia is hypodontia, where there is a congenital lack of teeth.

The scientific definition of hyperdontia is "any tooth or odontogenic structure that is formed from tooth germ in excess of usual number for any given region of the dental arch." The additional teeth, which may be few or many, can occur on any place in the dental arch. Their arrangement may be symmetrical or non-symmetrical.

== Signs and symptoms ==
The presence of a supernumerary tooth, particularly when seen in young children, is associated with a disturbance of the maxillary incisor region. This commonly results in the impaction of the incisors during the mixed dentition stage. The study debating this also considered many other factors such as: the patient's age, number, morphology, growth orientation and position of the supernumerary tooth. Alongside this issue, the presence of an extra tooth can impede the eruption of adjacent additional or normal teeth. Therefore, the presence of a supernumerary tooth when found must be approached with the appropriate treatment plan, incorporating the likelihood of incisal crowding.

In some individuals, the additional teeth can erupt far from the dental arch, within the maxillary sinus. The extra teeth may also migrate to a different location after development. In some cases, supernumerary teeth can lead to the formation of cysts. Crowding is also frequently seen in people with hyperdontia.

== Causes ==
There is evidence of hereditary factors along with some evidence of environmental factors leading to this condition. While a single excess tooth is relatively common, multiple hyperdontia is rare in people with no other associated diseases or syndromes. Many supernumerary teeth never erupt, but they may delay eruption of nearby teeth or cause other dental or orthodontic problems. Molar-type extra teeth are the most common type. Dental X-rays are often used to diagnose hyperdontia.

It is suggested that supernumerary teeth develop from a third tooth bud arising from the dental lamina near the regular tooth bud or possibly from splitting the regular tooth bud itself. Supernumerary teeth in deciduous (baby) teeth are less common than in permanent teeth.

=== Evolution ===
Specific genes play a role in determining the number and pattern of teeth that develop in an individual, and mutations or variations in these genes can result in the formation of extra teeth. An individual can inherit a genetic predisposition to hyperdontia from its parents. If an individual with hyperdontia reproduces, their offspring have an increased likelihood of having the same condition, as their offspring have an increased likelihood of having the same condition because hyperdontia has been proposed as having an autosomal dominant mode of inheritance. This is the result of mutations that can be passed on to offspring through several different genes associated with tooth development.

The MSX1 and MSX2 genes are among the most well-documented genetic factors associated with hyperdontia. Because these genes play a crucial role in tooth development and patterning, mutations in MSX1 and MSX2 can lead to the formation of extra teeth or changes in tooth number and shape. Additionally, mutations in the AXIN2 gene have been linked to hyperdontia and other anomalous dental traits. The AXIN2 gene is involved in regulating the Wnt signaling pathway, which plays a role in tooth development. Therefore, variations in this gene can disrupt tooth development and result in supernumerary teeth. PAX9 is another gene important to tooth development, and mutations in this gene have been associated with dental anomalies, including hyperdontia. PAX9 is involved in the formation of molar teeth, and disruptions in its function can lead to extra molars or changes in tooth morphology.

The formation of teeth begins during embryonic development and is a process that is highly regulated by various signaling pathways, which, if disrupted as a result of genetic mutations or environmental factors, can lead to developmental anomalies, including hyperdontia. Tooth development begins with the formation of tooth buds in the jaw. The dental lamina is a band of tissue in the developing oral cavity that gives rise to tooth buds. Hyperactivity of the dental lamina, as well as disruption of the differentiation and morphogenesis stages of tooth development, can lead to the formation of extra tooth buds, which can develop into supernumerary teeth.

Furthermore, some developmental syndromes or medical conditions may also result in hyperdontia. For instance, cleidocranial dysplasia (CCD) is a genetic disorder that affects skeletal and dental development and is associated with the presence of supernumerary teeth. Trauma or injury to the oral cavity, particularly during tooth development, also has the potential to trigger the formation of supernumerary teeth because it disrupts normal tooth development. Occasionally, additional teeth may also arise from developmental anomalies like fusion or gemination. Fusion occurs when two tooth buds fuse together, creating a single, larger tooth. Gemination involves the incomplete division of a single tooth bud into two teeth. In some cases, these anomalies may take the form of the appearance of extra teeth.

Evolutionarily, hyperdontia can be seen as a result of genetic variation. Although extra teeth may be a maladaptive trait in modern humans due to potential dental issues and crowding, whether individuals with supernumerary teeth have a benefit or disadvantage is unknown. In the context of human evolutionary history, dental care was virtually nonexistent, meaning that there was no way to address dental issues such as tooth decay, infection, or loss of teeth. Therefore, individuals with supernumerary teeth may have been better equipped to cope with dental problems, for the loss of necessary teeth could be alleviated by having extra teeth present so that chewing and processing food remained possible. Furthermore, ancestral diets were often tougher and required more extensive chewing, meaning that being in the possession of extra teeth could help to facilitate the consumption of fibrous plant material and raw foods.

=== Related conditions ===
Hyperdontia is seen in a number of disorders, including Gardner's syndrome and cleidocranial dysostosis, where multiple supernumerary teeth develop. Other associated conditions are: Cleidocranial dysplasia, Ehlers–Danlos syndrome Type III, Ellis–van Creveld syndrome, Gardner's syndrome, Goldenhar syndrome, Hallermann–Streiff syndrome, Orofaciodigital syndrome type I, Incontinentia pigmenti, Marfan syndrome, Nance–Horan syndrome, and Tricho-rhino-phalangeal syndrome Type 1.

== Diagnosis ==
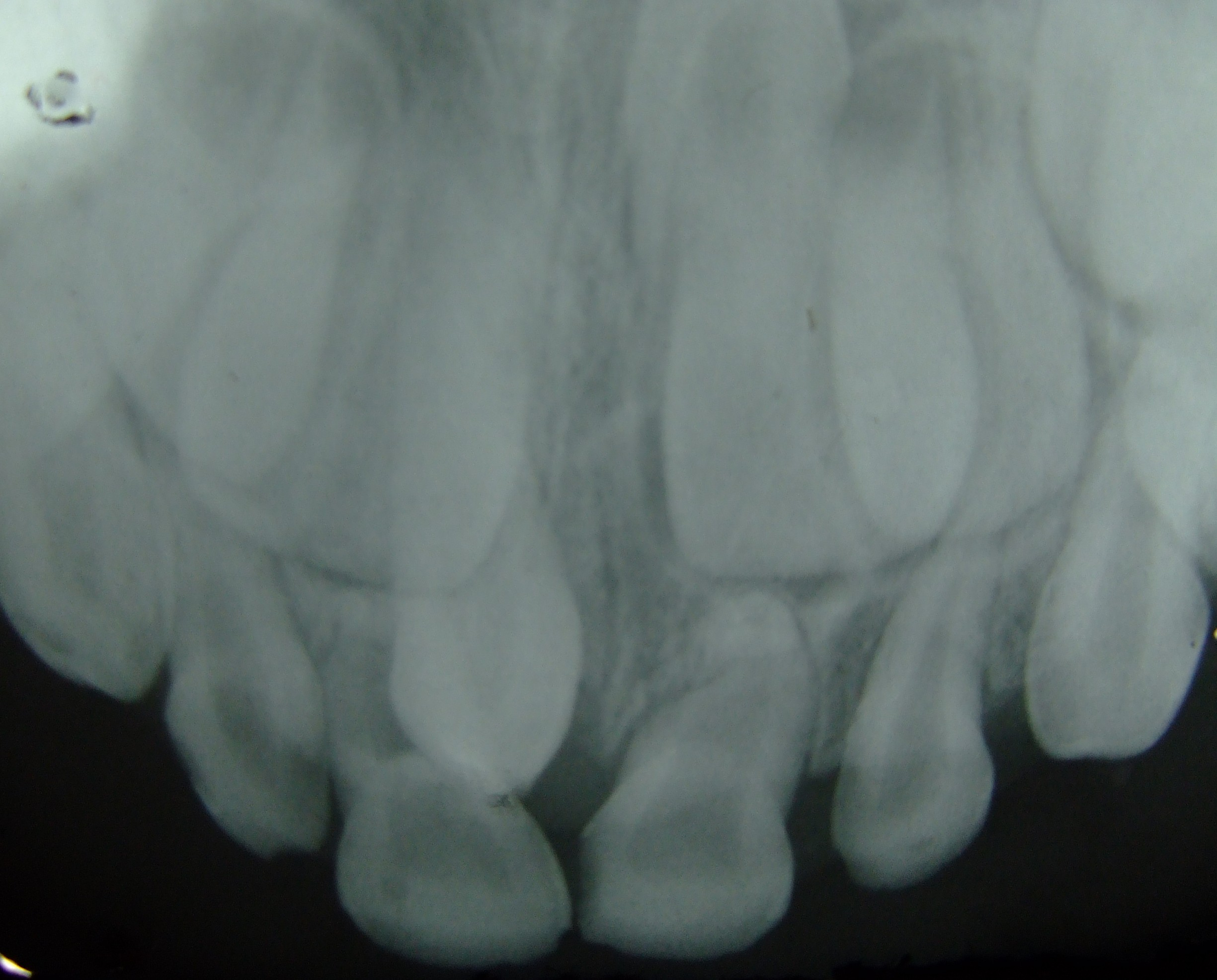
X-ray showing supernumerary teeth in the premaxillary area

Supernumerary teeth may be detected by taking two different dental X-rays at different angles. Examples of this may be an intra-oral X-ray (one that is taken inside the mouth) and a panoramic radiograph. However, these X-rays are 2D and therefore do not accurately portray the 3D view of the teeth.

=== Types ===
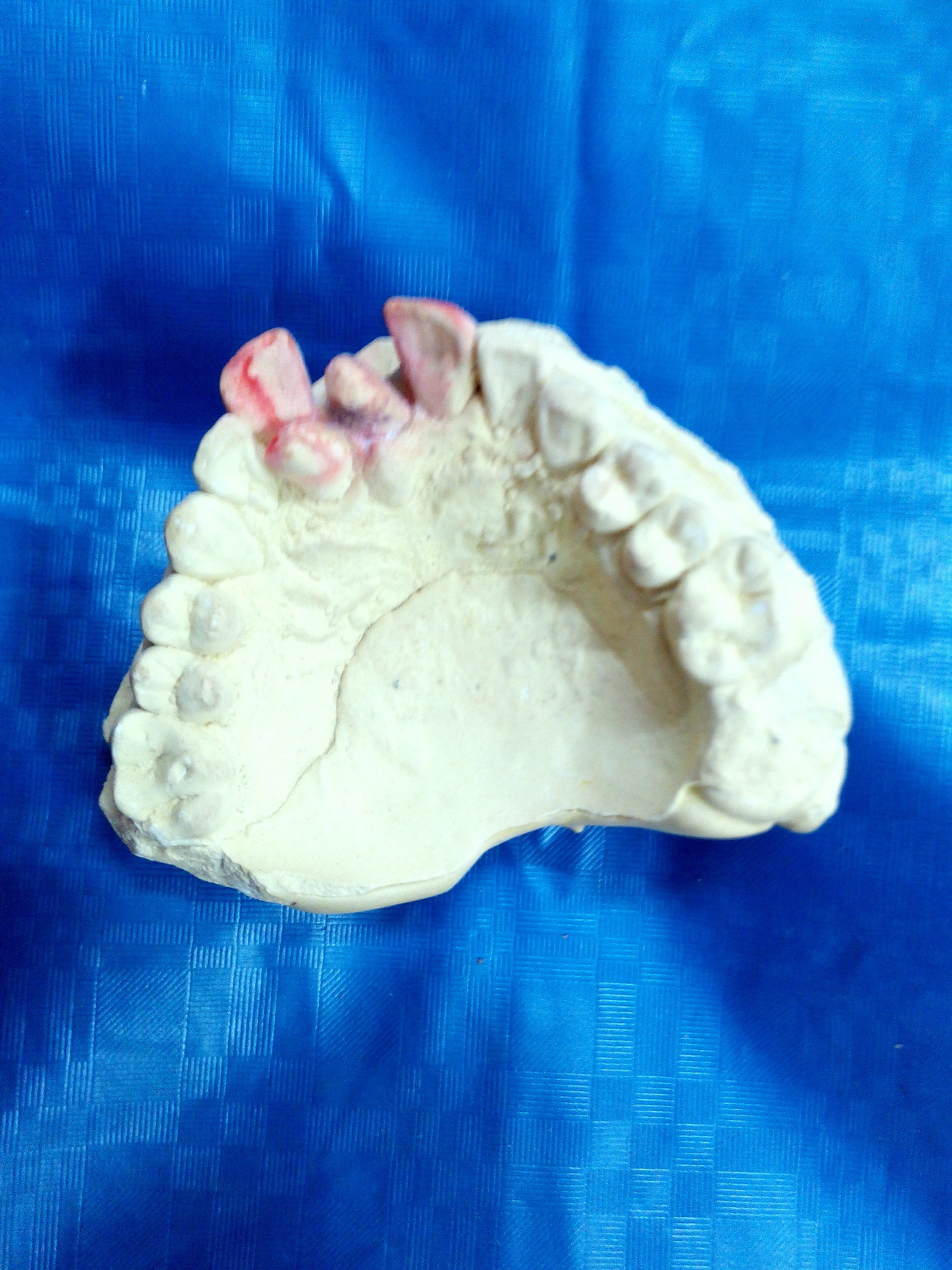
Dental stone model showing mesiodens and accessory tooth behind right central incisor

Supernumerary teeth can be classified by shape and by position. The shapes include the following:

- Supplemental (where the tooth has a normal shape for the teeth in that series);
- Tuberculate (also called barrel shaped);
- Conical (also called peg shaped);
- Compound odontoma (multiple small tooth-like forms);
- Complex odontoma (a disorganized mass of dental tissue)

When classified by position, a supernumerary tooth may be referred to as a mesiodens, a paramolar, or a distomolar. Occasionally, these teeth do not erupt into the oral cavity but manifest as a malocclusion.

The most common supernumerary tooth is a mesiodens, which is a malformed, peg-like tooth that occurs between the maxillary central incisors. Fourth and fifth molars that form behind the third molars are another kind of supernumerary teeth.

== Treatment ==
Although these teeth are usually asymptomatic and pose no threat to the individual, they are often extracted for aesthetic reasons, to allow the eruption of other teeth, orthodontic reasons and/or suspected pathology. This is done particularly if the mesiodens is positioned in the maxillary central incisor region. The traditional method of removal is done by using bone chisels, although a more advanced technique has been found to be more beneficial, especially if surgery is required. Through the use of piezoelectricity, piezoelectric ultrasonic bone surgery may be more time-consuming than the traditional method but it seems to reduce the post-operative bleeding and associated complications quite significantly.

== Epidemiology ==
It is evident that hyperdontia is more common in the permanent dentition than in the primary. There is a considerable difference between males and females in the prevalence of these teeth in permanent dentition; hyperdontia is twice as common in males as in females. However, this approximation varies in terms of location, other associating syndromes that may be present, and the ethnicity of the individual. In terms of ethnicity, it can be seen that hyperdontia is in fact less common in European than in Asian populations. There is evidence to show that an individual is more likely to have hyperdontia if other members of their family also have the condition.

== Famous people with hyperdontia ==
Agrippina the Younger, mother of Emperor Nero, was reported to have an extra canine in her upper right jaw. This was seen as a sign of good fortune in Ancient Rome. The actor Gaten Matarazzo had hyperdontia but underwent surgery to remove his extraneous teeth. Freddie Mercury, lead singer for British band Queen, also had hyperdontia. David DeVore Jr. gained internet fame after being filmed after removing a supernumerary tooth at the dentist. Evano Mellone, a Canadian man, entered the Guinness World Records for having the most teeth in a human mouth, at 41 teeth. The record among women is 38 teeth, held by Kalpana Balan from India.

== Historical mentions ==
Timarchos (either son or father of Nicocles of Paphos) is said to have had "a double row of cheek-teeth." The daughter of Mithridates VI, Drypetina, is said to have a double row of teeth. Agrippina the Younger, sister of Caligula, wife of Claudius, and mother of Nero, is said to have had a double canine in her right upper jaw, something that was seen as a sign of good fortune by the Romans.

The semi-mythological Emperor Ku is attributed with this condition.

One of the Great Peacemaker's names is "Deganawidah," which has been translated by some to mean "Double Row of Teeth."

Realdo Colombo, a 16th-century physician, mentioned in his writings that one of his sons, Phoebus, had "a treble row of teeth"

Louis XIII had a double row of teeth in one of his jaws, which impacted his speech.

Benjamin Bucklin, a Rhode Island soldier who died during King Philip's War. He and a small group of men survived an ambush by Native Americans, but were subsequently captured and tortured to death on a spot later dubbed Nine Men's Misery. The site was later disturbed by a group of medical students and the January 20, 1886 edition of the Providence Journal reported: "One of the skeletons dug up was of extraordinary size, and by the fact of it’s having a double set of teeth, was recognized as that of Benjamin Bucklin (Buckland), of Rehoboth."

Fabian Fournier, a 19th-century Canadian lumberjack (who is said to have inspired the American folklore figure Paul Bunyan)

William Morgan (an anti-mason who was found dead under suspicious circumstances) was identified by his wife, as she recognized the body by his having "double teeth all around"

Freddie Mercury of Queen had four extra teeth in his upper jaw. He was self-conscious about this, so he often covered them up with his lip or hand, and by growing a mustache. Mercury refused to correct his alignment issue because he believed it contributed to his wide singing range, and that correcting his teeth would negatively affect his voice.

Peter Steele is said to have had hyperdontia.

== Folklore and mythology ==
A poem by ancient Greek poet Ion describe the hero Heracles as having three rows of teeth.

Len Linfhiaclach (lit. "Len of the Many Teeth"), a goldsmith who lived about the year 300, is the subject of Gaelic text Dindseanchas

Tukwishhemish is a character from a Cahuilla folk tale, a beautiful woman who smiled but never laughed on account of her having double rows of teeth in her upper jaw.

Witches in certain parts of Estonia are said to be able to be recognized by having unusual teeth including double rows of teeth, giving rise to their being called hambamees (lit. "tooth-man"); so as well can the Slavic upyr be recognized by its double rows of teeth.

== Literature ==
"A Legend of MacAlister More" (1828) features the character of Duncan Roy or "Duncan Roy tda reugh cachghlin" or "Red Duncan of the two rows of teeth."
