= Tracheoesophageal septum =

Embryological structure dividing the trachea from the oesophagus

Details
- Days: 26
- Precursor: Tracheoesophageal folds

The tracheoesophageal septum is an embryological structure. It is formed from the tracheoesophageal folds or ridges which fuse in the midline. It divides the oesophagus from the trachea during prenatal development. Developmental abnormalities can lead to a tracheoesophageal fistula.

== Structure ==
The tracheoesophageal septum is formed from the tracheoesophageal folds laterally (longitudinal ridges), which fuse in the midline. It divides the oesophagus from the trachea. This is complete by 6 weeks of gestation. It divides the foregut tube: the laryngotracheal tube ventrally and oesophagus dorsally.

== Function ==
The tracheoesophageal septum divides the oesophagus from the trachea during prenatal development.

== Clinical significance ==
Developmental abnormalities of the tracheoesophageal septum can lead to a tracheoesophageal fistula. This may be caused by certain mutations of genes involved in its development. Other theories for the origin of tracheoesophageal fistula have been suggested. A laryngotracheal cleft is a related abnormality.
