= MYH8 =

Protein-coding gene in the species Homo sapiens

Identifiers
- Aliases: MYH8, MyHC-peri, MyHC-pn, gtMHC-F, DA7, myosin, heavy chain 8, skeletal muscle, perinatal, myosin heavy chain 8
- External IDs: OMIM: 160741; MGI: 1339712; GeneCards: MYH8

Gene location (Human)
Chr.	Chromosome 17 (human)
Band	17p13.1	Start	10,390,322 bp
Band	17p13.1	End	10,421,950 bp

Gene location (Mouse)
Chr.	Chromosome 11 (mouse)
Band	11 B3|11 40.59 cM	Start	67,167,950 bp
Band	11 B3|11 40.59 cM	End	67,199,460 bp
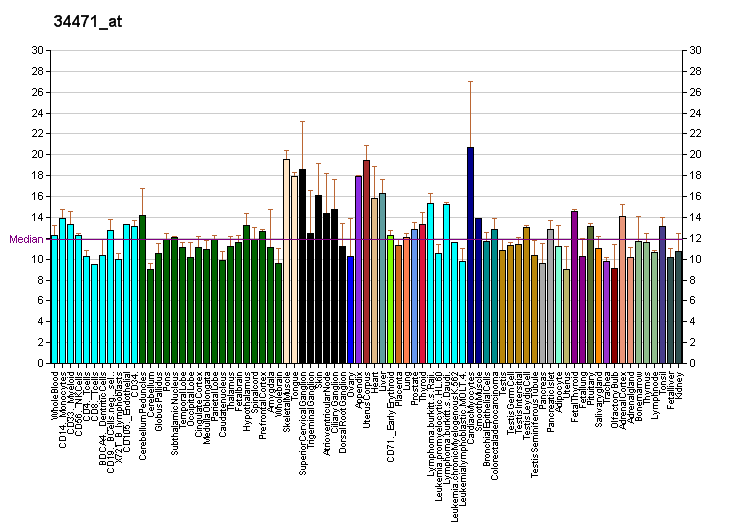

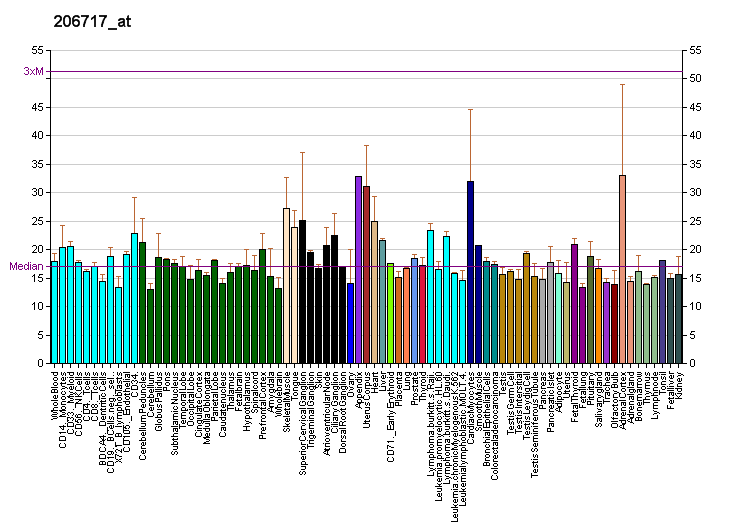
RNA expression pattern
Bgee	Human / Mouse (ortholog); Top expressed in: vastus lateralis muscle; Skeletal muscle tissue of rectus abdominis; triceps brachii muscle; Skeletal muscle tissue of biceps brachii; tibialis anterior muscle; deltoid muscle; glutes; testicle; kidney tubule; gastrocnemius muscle / Top expressed in: masseter muscle; esophagus; fossa; temporal muscle; human fetus; extraocular muscle; internal carotid artery; ankle joint; muscle of thigh; condyle; More reference expression data
BioGPS	More reference expression data
Gene ontology
Molecular function	myosin light chain binding; nucleotide binding; microfilament motor activity; structural constituent of muscle; ATPase activity; cytoskeletal motor activity; actin binding; ATP binding; calmodulin binding; myosin phosphatase activity; actin filament binding; microtubule motor activity; microtubule binding
Cellular component	cytoplasm; myosin filament; cytosol; muscle myosin complex; sarcomere; myofibril; myosin complex
Biological process	skeletal muscle contraction; ATP metabolic process; muscle contraction; muscle filament sliding; protein dephosphorylation; microtubule-based movement
Sources:Amigo / QuickGO
Orthologs
Databases	NCBI: entry; OMA: entry
Species	Human	Mouse
Entrez	4626	17885
Ensembl	ENSG00000133020	ENSMUSG00000055775
UniProt	P13535	P13542
RefSeq (mRNA)	NM_002472	NM_177369
RefSeq (protein)	NP_002463	NP_796343
Location (UCSC)	Chr 17: 10.39 – 10.42 Mb	Chr 11: 67.17 – 67.2 Mb
PubMed search
- Wikidata
View/Edit Human	View/Edit Mouse

Myosin-8, or myosin heavy chain 8, is a protein that is encoded by the MYH8 gene. Myosins are proteins found in muscle, composed of two heavy chains and two light chains.

The human MYH8 protein is 1,937 amino acids long, with a molecular mass of 222kDa.

Mutations in MYH8 are associated with Trismus pseudocamptodactyly syndrome.
