= Fryns–Aftimos syndrome =

- Other names: Baraitser–Winter syndrome 1 (BWS1), cerebro-oculo-facial-lymphatic syndrome, chromosome 7p22 deletion syndrome
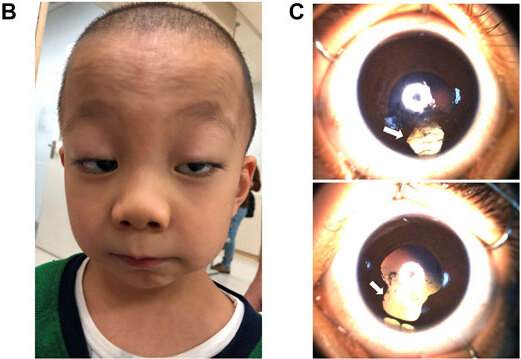
- Photo of the patient with Baraitser–Winter syndrome with highly arched eyebrow, anteverted nares, long philtrum, ptosis, thin upper lip, retrognathia, epicanthal fold, hypertelorism, and wide nasal bridge. In picture C bilateral coloboma can also be seen.
- Specialty: Medical genetics
- Causes: De novo mutation, autosomal dominant
- Diagnostic method: Serial single-gene testing, multigene panel, exome sequencing
- Differential diagnosis: Noonan syndrome (mild cases); Acrocallosal syndrome
- Prognosis: Poor with severe brain abnormalities, but milder cases can reach dependent adulthood
- Frequency: Rare: fewer than 50 cases reported in medical literature

Fryns–Aftimos syndrome (also known as Baraitser–Winter syndrome 1, or BWS1) is a rare chromosomal condition and is associated with pachygyria, severe intellectual disability, epilepsy and characteristic facial features. This syndrome is a malformation syndrome, characterized by numerous facial dysmorphias not limited to hypertelorism, iris or retinal coloboma, cleft lip, and congenital heart defects. This syndrome has been seen in 30 unrelated people. Characterized by a de novo mutation located on chromosome 7p22, there is typically no family history prior to onset. The severity of the disorder can be determined by the size of the deletion on 7p22, enveloping the ACTB gene and surrounding genes, which is consistent with a contiguous gene deletion syndrome. Confirming a diagnosis of Fryns–Aftimos syndrome typically consists of serial single-gene testing or multigene panel of genes of interest or exome sequencing.

== Signs and symptoms ==
Fryns–Aftimos syndrome is a genetic conditions that presents with a multitude of varying signs, symptoms and characteristics facies. Commonly characterized by hypertelorism, congenital nonmyopathic ptosis, iris or retinal coloboma, deafness, epilepsy, and pachygyria. Individuals affected by Fryns–Aftimos syndrome may also present with a broad nose that has a large tip and prominent root, a ridged metopic suture, arched eyebrows, a shoulder girdle muscle bulk and progressive joint stiffness, a cleft lip or palate, hallux duplex (a toe deformation), microcephaly, heart and renal tract abnormalities; all which contribute to the intellectual and developmental disabilities exhibited by affected individuals. Consequentially, it has been observed that those with this syndrome also have a short stature and the presence of an extra (duplicated) thumb.

The presentation and severity of the previously mentioned symptoms vary depending on the severity of the syndrome. Some individuals may be affected by all the discussed symptoms, and some may have only one or two. For example, the pachygyria associated with Fryns–Aftimos syndrome is rarely lissencephaly, or neuronal heterotopia. Additionally, the associated microcephaly is not a required, it can develop over time as the affected individual continues to live.

Those who have diagnosed condition have differing degrees of the following:

- dysmorphism
- hypertelorism
- metopic ridging of the skull
- wide palpebral fissures
- long downslanted palpebral fissures
- congenital ptosis
- broad nose
- prominent nasal root
- long philtrum
- mild micrognathia
- highly arched eyebrows.

Other less common features of this disorder are:

- cleft lip and palate
- ocular anomalies such as iris and/or retinal coloboma
- microphthalmos
- cortical dysplasia
- pachygyria
- subcortical band heterotopia

More serious cases may exhibit:

- lissencephaly
- microcephaly
- hydronephrosis
- intellectual deficiency
- other brain anomalies
- drug-resistant epilepsy
- movement limitations
- kyphoscoliosis

== Etiology ==
"BWS1 is a genetically heterogeneous disorder, caused by a heterozygous mutation in one of the two genes coding for ubiquitously expressed actins: ACTB, located to 7p22-p12 (BRWS1) and ACTG1 on 17q25.3 (BRWS2). All mutations are missense and probably act by a gain of function mechanism, as deletions of the same genes do not result in BWS phenotype." Functional copies of ACTB and ACTG1 genes provide instructions for protein production of beta (β)-actin and gamma (γ)-actin, respectively. As an intrinsic disorder, current research indicates that mutations in an individual's DNA are responsible for expression.

In recent years, studies have been conducted to determine the extent of causative mutations affecting the ACTB gene. In order to determine the functionality and effect of certain mutations, whole-exome sequencing (WES) has been employed upon "aborted fetuses and children with syndromic brain malformations in which chromosomal microarray analysis was previously unremarkable."

Fryns–Aftimos syndrome has an autosomal dominant inheritance pattern caused by a heterozygous mutation in the ACTB gene on chromosome 7p22. This mutation occurs de novo, typically meaning there is no family history prior to onset; the disorder presents for the first time in a family in the affected individual. However, once present Fryns–Aftimos syndrome is characterized by an autosomal dominant inheritance pattern, as previously mentioned, which means that individuals with a heterozygous or homozygous dominant genotype will display the phenotypic traits associated with the syndrome. The severity of symptoms are linked to the size of the deletion on chromosome 7p22 because certain individuals may have a larger deletion on 7p22, enveloping the ACTB gene and surrounding genes, which is consistent with a contiguous gene deletion syndrome.

== Diagnosis ==
Fryns–Aftimos can be detected prenatally from the occurrence of abnormal gyration patterns in the fetus. Care should be employed when performing antenatal diagnoses as miscarriage and other complications are possible. The diagnosis of unremarkable prenatal scans can be supplemented through the use of WES or trio sequencing.

BWS1 diagnoses are commonly confirmed via DNA sequencing of ACTB and ACTG1 genes. Serial single-gene testing performs a sequence analysis of ACTB followed by ACTG1. Deletion/duplication analysis is not a possible method of diagnosis as all associated mutations are missense in nature.

Multigene panels are employed to differentiate BWS1 from different mutations with similar phenotypic characteristics such as Noonan syndrome. Associated genes analyzed in multigene panels for BWS1 include KIF5C, KIF2A, DYNC1H1, WDR62, and TUBG1 genes.

== Management ==
Educative measures can partially manage developmental delays, with success variable on the degree of severity. Management of epilepsy is difficult, and some pachygyria patients are drug resistant, including to combination therapies. Orthopedic monitoring is mandatory, since progressive joint limitations could lead to loss of autonomous ambulation.

Treatment of Fryns–Aftimos syndrome is similar to other developmental disorders in which speech and physical therapy are offered as a mechanism through which to manage associated characteristics of developmental delay. The frequency and duration of treatment is largely dependent upon the severity of the disability itself. Since Fryns–Aftimos syndrome is commonly characterized by pachygyria, individuals may experience chronic seizures that can be treated with anti-epileptic drugs (AEDs).

Medical surveillance is highly recommended for those with more severe forms of BWS. Routine follow ups are recommended for neurodevelopmental assessment with particular emphasis upon coloboma (ophthalmologic evaluation), hearing loss (audiologic evaluation), cardiac defects, and renal tract anomalies.

Individuals with this condition usually begin walking at the age of 3, although seizures may also happen at the exact same age.

Life expectancy for those with the syndrome is low. At age 35, New Zealander Andrew Oliver was the oldest-known person to have survived with the condition. He died at the age of 41.

== See also ==
- Chromosome abnormalities
- Aneuploidy
- Karyotype
