= TRPS1 =

Protein-coding gene in the species Homo sapiens

Identifiers
- Aliases: TRPS1, GC79, LGCR, transcriptional repressor GATA binding 1
- External IDs: OMIM: 604386; MGI: 1927616; GeneCards: TRPS1

Gene location (Human)
| Chr. | Chromosome 8 (human) |
| Band | 8q23.3 | Start | 115,408,496 bp |
| Band | 8q23.3 | End | 115,809,673 bp |

Gene location (Mouse)
| Chr. | Chromosome 15 (mouse) |
| Band | 15 C|15 19.18 cM | Start | 50,654,752 bp |
| Band | 15 C|15 19.18 cM | End | 50,890,463 bp |
RNA expression pattern
| Bgee | Human / Mouse (ortholog); Top expressed in: lactiferous duct; Achilles tendon; tendon of biceps brachii; hair follicle; tibia; cartilage tissue; synovial joint; dorsal motor nucleus of vagus nerve; gingival epithelium; nipple / Top expressed in: upper lip; hand; maxillary prominence; foot; vas deferens; zygote; Rostral migratory stream; secondary oocyte; aortic valve; calvaria; More reference expression data |
| BioGPS | n/a |
Gene ontology
| Molecular function | DNA binding; sequence-specific DNA binding; DNA-binding transcription factor activity; DNA-binding transcription activator activity, RNA polymerase II-specific; zinc ion binding; chromatin binding; metal ion binding; protein binding; nucleic acid binding; protein domain specific binding; RNA polymerase II transcription regulatory region sequence-specific DNA binding; DNA-binding transcription repressor activity, RNA polymerase II-specific; DNA-binding transcription factor activity, RNA polymerase II-specific |
| Cellular component | transcription regulator complex; nucleoplasm; nucleus; protein-containing complex |
| Biological process | skeletal system development; regulation of transcription, DNA-templated; negative regulation of transcription by RNA polymerase II; transcription by RNA polymerase II; transcription, DNA-templated; NLS-bearing protein import into nucleus; regulation of chondrocyte differentiation; positive regulation of transcription by RNA polymerase II; cell differentiation; protein heterooligomerization |
Sources:Amigo / QuickGO
Orthologs
| Databases | NCBI: entry; OMA: entry |
| Species | Human | Mouse |
| Entrez | 7227 | 83925 |
| Ensembl | ENSG00000104447 | ENSMUSG00000038679 |
| UniProt | Q9UHF7 | Q925H1 |
| RefSeq (mRNA) | NM_001282902; NM_001282903; NM_014112; NM_001330599 | NM_032000; NM_001310481; NM_001310485 |
| RefSeq (protein) | NP_001269831; NP_001269832; NP_001317528; NP_054831 | n/a |
| Location (UCSC) | Chr 8: 115.41 – 115.81 Mb | Chr 15: 50.65 – 50.89 Mb |
| PubMed search |
- Wikidata
| View/Edit Human | View/Edit Mouse |

Zinc finger transcription factor Trps1 is a protein that in humans is encoded by the TRPS1 gene.

This gene encodes a GATA-like transcription factor that represses GATA-regulated genes and binds to a dynein light chain protein. Binding of the encoded protein to the dynein light chain protein affects binding to GATA consensus sequences and suppresses its transcriptional activity. Defects in this gene are a cause of tricho–rhino–phalangeal syndrome (TRPS) types I–III (also known as the Langer–Giedion syndrome).
