= Triphalangeal thumbs-brachyectrodactyly syndrome =

- Specialty: Medical genetics
- Symptoms: Distal limb anomalies
- Complications: Grip, walking
- Usual onset: Birth
- Duration: Lifelong
- Causes: Genetic mutation
- Prevention: None
- Treatment: Corrective surgery
- Prognosis: Good
- Frequency: very rare, only 27 cases from seven families have been described in medical literature. it seems to be more common in Mexico.

Triphalangeal thumbs-brachyectrodactyly syndrome is a very rare limb malformation syndrome of genetic origin which is characterized by polydactyly, syndactyly, brachydactyly, ectrodactyly, triphalangeal thumb and polyphalangism. Onychodystrophy and anonychia are also seen often. 27 cases from seven families from Mexico and the United States have been described in medical literature. It is inherited in an autosomal dominant manner and thought to be caused by mutations in the HOXD13 gene, in chromosome 2.
