= Tracheobronchopathia osteochondroplastica =

Rare medical condition

- Other names: Tracheopathia osteoplastica
- Tracheobronchopathia osteochondroplastica is inherited in an autosomal dominant manner.

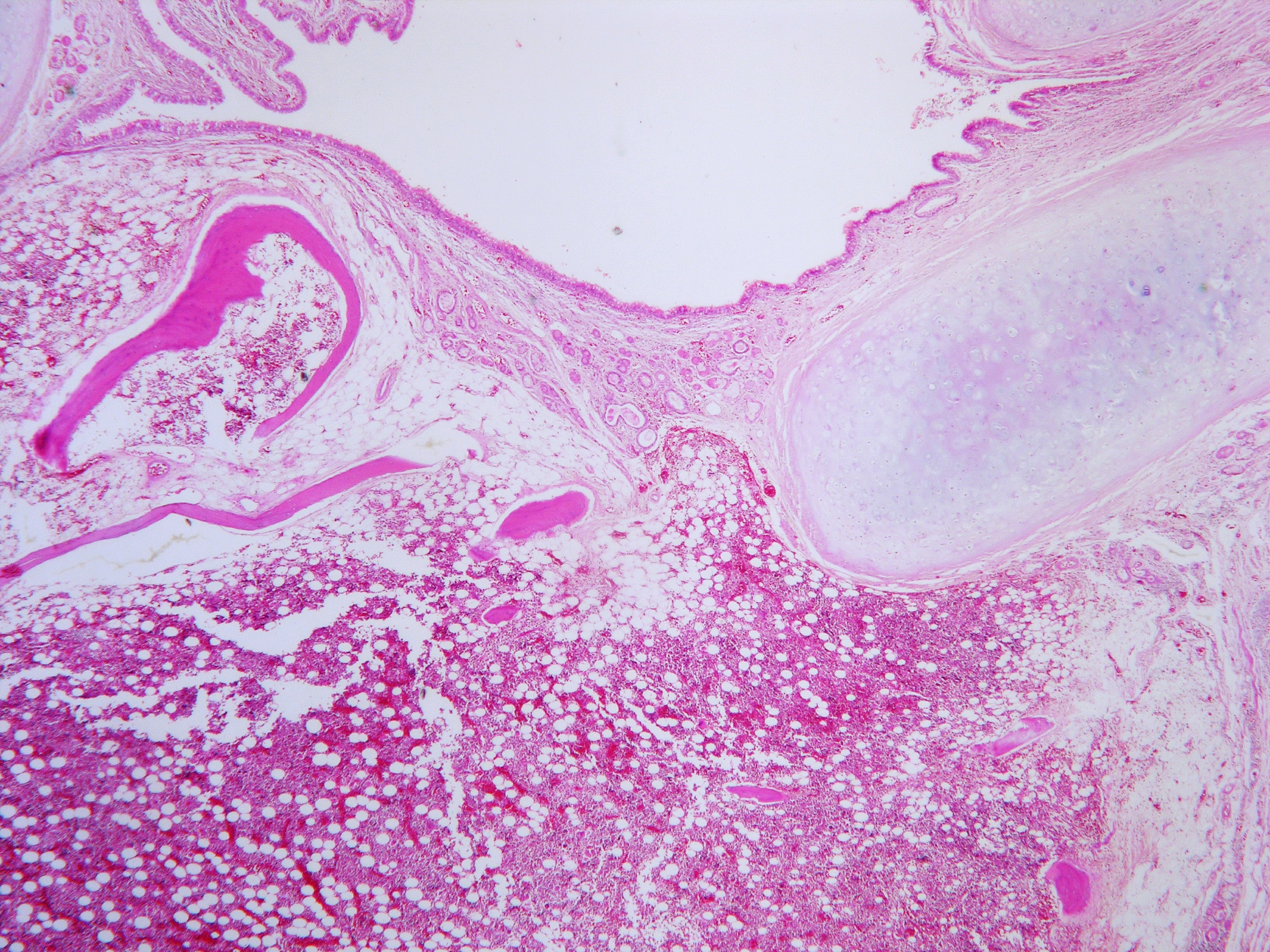

Tracheobronchopathia osteochondroplastica (TO) is a rare benign disease of unknown cause, in which multiple cartilaginous or bony submucosal nodules project into the trachea and proximal bronchi. The nodules usually spare the posterior wall of the airway because they are of cartilaginous origin, while the posterior wall of the airway is membranous (does not contain cartilage). This is as opposed to tracheobronchial amyloidosis, which does not spare the posterior wall.

It usually occurs in men around their fifth decade of life, as opposed to tracheobronchial papillomatosis due to HPV infection, which usually occurs in younger patients. TO can cause airway obstruction, bleeding and chronic cough. Treatment involves the use of bronchodilators, and physical dilatation by bronchoscopy. The patients are also more prone to post-obstructive pneumonia and chronic lung infection in severe cases.

== Diagnosis ==
=== Differential diagnosis ===
The differential of TO includes amyloidosis, which is typically circumferential, papillomatosis, though this usually occurs in younger patients and can cause lung cavitation when disseminated, granulomatosis with polyangiitis, though this is circumferential as well and often involves distal lung cavitation as well. Relapsing polychondritis can also spare the posterior wall, though it is not typically nodular in appearance.
