= Tucker syndrome =

- Other names: Ptosis-vocal cord paralysis syndrome
- Specialty: Medical genetics
- Causes: Genetic mutation
- Prevention: none
- Prognosis: Medium to Bad
- Frequency: very rare, only 2 cases have been reported
- Deaths: -

Tucker syndrome, also known as Ptosis-vocal cord paralysis syndrome, is a very rare genetic disorder which is characterized by congenital bilateral ptosis and (also congenital and bilateral) recurrent laryngeal nerve paresis. Additional findings include short stature. It was described in a small 2-generation family (a man and his daughter).
