= Thoracic dysplasia-hydrocephalus syndrome =

- Specialty: Medical genetics
- Usual onset: Birth
- Prevention: none
- Prognosis: poor; respiratory failure soon after birth is common
- Deaths: 2

Thoracic dysplasia-hydrocephalus syndrome is a rare autosomal recessive genetic disorder characterized by shortening of the ribs, narrowing of the chest, mild shortening of the limbs (rhizomelia), hydrocephalus, and variable developmental delays. It has been described in two siblings born to consanguineous Pakistani parents.
