= Tsukuhara syndrome =

- Other names: Radioulnar synostosis-microcephaly-scoliosis syndrome
- Specialty: Orthopedic

Tsukuhara syndrome, also known as radioulnar synostosis-microcephaly-scoliosis syndrome, is an infrequently occurring genetic skeletal dysplasia which is characterized by a combination of radioulnar synostosis, microcephaly, scoliosis, short stature, and intellectual disabilities. Only 13 cases worldwide have been described in medical literature.
