= Trichostasis spinulosa =

- Specialty: Dermatology

Trichostasis spinulosa is a common but rarely diagnosed disorder of the hair follicles that clinically gives the impression of blackheads, but the follicles are filled with funnel-shaped, horny plugs that are bundles of vellus hairs.

== Signs and symptoms ==
Trichostasis spinulosa can appear in several ways, such as open comedones or elevated follicular spicules, or it can stay invisible. Lesions on the face, cheek, and nose are frequently found in the patients.

== Causes ==
The exact etiology of trichostasis spinulosa is unknown. There have been suggestions for congenital variables such hair follicle dysplasia as well as extrinsic elements like dust, oils, UV light, heat, and allergens. According to one theory, hyperkeratosis in the follicular infundibulum causes hair shaft entrapment, which prevents regular hair shedding.

== Diagnosis ==
Standard skin surface biopsy (SSSB) is a noninvasive method used for diagnosis.

Favre-Racouchot syndrome, eruptive vellus hair cysts, keratosis pilaris, and comedogenic acne are among the conditions that might be identified as differential diagnoses for facial trichostasis spinulosa.

== Treatment ==
Various therapeutic techniques, such as hydroactive adhesive tapes, local keratolytics, oral and local retinoids, have been tested with varying degrees of success. Capryloyl salicylic acid peelings performed repeatedly have produced positive results.

== See also ==
- List of cutaneous conditions
