= Trismus pseudocamptodactyly syndrome =

- Other names: Dutch-Kentucky syndrome, Distal arthrogryposis type 7

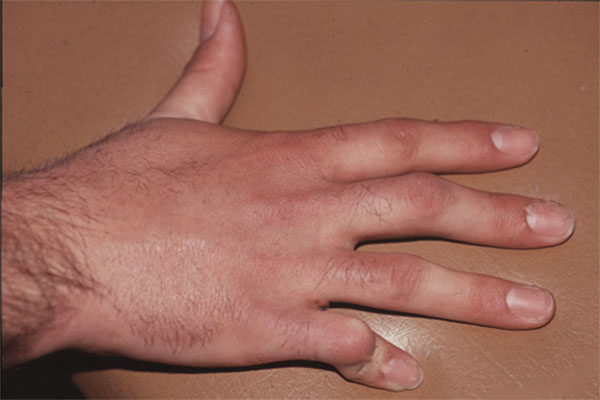
Congenital camptodaktyly of the 5th (little) finger

Trismus pseudocamptodactyly syndrome is a rare genetic condition. A defining feature is the inability to open the mouth completely (trismus). Other signs and symptoms include abnormally short tendons and muscles, resulting in contractures, club foot, and other musculoskeletal abnormalities.

== Genetics ==
It is an autosomal dominant condition caused by a mutation in MYH8. Approximately 60 cases have been reported worldwide.

== Treatment ==
Treatment is symptomatic in nature.
