= Laryngotracheal groove =

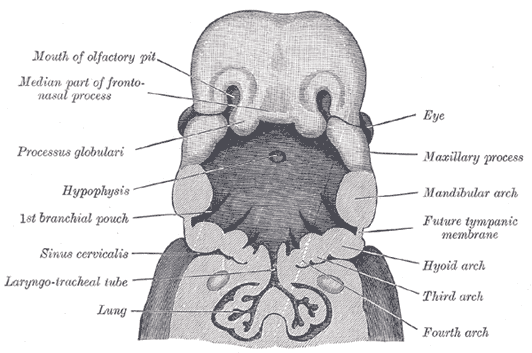
- The head and neck of a human embryo thirty-two days old, seen from the ventral surface. The floor of the mouth and pharynx have been removed. (Laryngotracheal tube labeled at lower left, second from bottom.)

Details
- Days: 28
- Precursor: endoderm
- Gives rise to: larynx and trachea

Identifiers
- Latin: sulcus laryngotrachealis
- TE: groove_by_E5.5.3.0.0.0.2 E5.5.3.0.0.0.2

The laryngotracheal groove is a precursor for the larynx and trachea.

The rudiment of the respiratory organs appears as a median longitudinal groove in the ventral wall of the pharynx. The groove deepens, and its lips fuse to form a septum, which grows from below upward and converts the groove into a tube, the laryngotracheal tube. The cephalic end opens into the pharynx through a slit-like aperture formed by the persistent anterior part of the groove. Initially, the cephalic end is in open communication with the foregut, but eventually it becomes separated by the indentations of the mesoderm, the tracheoesophageal folds.

When the tracheoesophageal folds fuse in the midline to form the tracheoesophageal septum, the foregut is divided into the trachea ventrally and the esophagus dorsally. The tube is lined by an endoderm, from which the epithelial lining of the respiratory tract is developed. The cephalic part of the tube becomes the larynx, and its next succeeding part is the trachea, while from its caudal end, a respiratory diverticulum appears as the lung bud. The lung bud branches into two lateral outgrowths known as the bronchial buds, one on each side of the trachea. The right and left bronchial buds branch into main (primary), lobar (secondary), segmental (tertiary), and subsegmental bronchi and lead to the development of the lungs. The Hox complex, FGF-10 (fibroblast growth factor), BMP-4 (bone morphogenetic protein), N-myc (a proto-oncogene), syndecan (a proteglycan), tenascin (an extracellular matrix protein), and epimorphin (a protein) appear to play a role in the development of the respiratory system.
