= Tricho-rhino-phalangeal syndrome Type 1 =

- Other names: TRPS I, Trichorhinophalangeal dysplasia type 1/3, Giedion syndrome
- Specialty: Medical genetics, Orthopedics
- Symptoms: Sparse and thin hair, bulbous nose tip, short stature, brachydactyly, cone-shaped epiphyses, joint abnormalities, distinctive facial features
- Complications: Hip dysplasia, joint degeneration, excessive sweating
- Usual onset: Congenital
- Duration: Lifelong
- Causes: mutation in the TRPS1 gene
- Diagnostic method: Clinical examination, genetic testing
- Treatment: Supportive care, orthopedic interventions
- Prognosis: Variable
- Frequency: Rare, exact prevalence unknown

Trichorhinophalangeal Syndrome Type I (TRPS I) is a rare genetic disorder characterized by distinctive craniofacial and skeletal abnormalities. The name reflects the primary features: "tricho" refers to hair, "rhino" to the nose, and "phalangeal" to the fingers and toes.

== Signs and symptoms ==
Individuals with TRPS I typically present with hair, facial features, and skeletal abnormalities. Hair abnormalities include sparse, thin, and slow-growing scalp hair. Distinctive facial characteristics include thick eyebrows, a broad nose with a rounded tip, large, protruding ears, a long, smooth philtrum, a thin upper lip, and small teeth that may be either reduced or increased in number. Individuals affected with the disorders also typically exhibit short stature, brachydactyly (short fingers and toes), cone-shaped epiphyses, hip dysplasia, and other bone deformities.

== Cause and diagnosis ==
TRPS I is caused by heterozygous pathogenic variants in the TRPS1 gene, which plays a role in the development of various tissues. The condition follows an autosomal dominant inheritance pattern, meaning a single copy of the altered gene can cause the disorder. Diagnosis is based on clinical evaluation, identification of characteristic physical features, and radiographic findings. Genetic testing can confirm mutations in the TRPS1 gene.

== Management ==
Treatment of TRPS I is symptomatic and supportive, involving a multidisciplinary approach including orthopedic Interventions to address skeletal deformities and improve mobility; dermatological care to manage hair abnormalities including topical minoxidil which has shown improvement in hair density and length. Other management approaches include endocrinological support to monitor growth and development, recombinant human growth hormone therapy has been used to improve height outcomes. Dental anomalies such as hypodontia or supernumerary teeth can also be addressed with appropriate orthodontic options.
