= Foregut =

Anterior part of the gastrointestinal tract

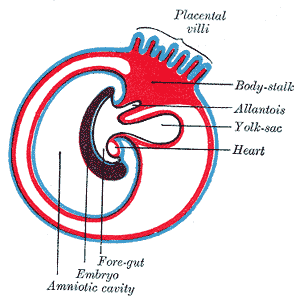
- Diagram showing the expansion of amnion and delimitation of the umbilicus.

- Termination of the foregut.

Details
- Carnegie stage: 9
- Precursor: Endoderm

Identifiers
- Latin: praeenteron, proenteron
- TE: E5.4.4.0.0.0.2
- FMA: 45616

The foregut in humans is the anterior part of the alimentary canal, from the proximal esophagus to the first half of the duodenum, at the entrance of the bile duct. Beyond the stomach, the foregut is attached to the abdominal walls by mesentery. The foregut arises from the endoderm, developing from the folding primitive gut, and is developmentally distinct from the midgut and hindgut. Although the term “foregut” is typically used in reference to the anterior section of the primitive gut, components of the adult gut can also be described with this designation. Pain in the epigastric region, just below the intersection of the ribs, typically refers to structures in the adult foregut.

== Adult foregut ==
=== Components ===
- Esophagus
- Respiratory tract (lower respiratory tract)
- Stomach
- Duodenum (up to ampulla of vater)
- Liver
- Gallbladder
- Pancreas
- Spleen – The spleen arises from the mesodermal dorsal mesentery (the foregut arises from the endoderm not mesoderm). But the spleen shares the same blood supply as many of the mature structures that arise from the foregut (i.e. the celiac artery)

=== Nerve supply ===
The enteric nervous system is one of the major divisions of the nervous system derived from neural crest cells. In mammals, it is composed of large number of interconnected ganglia that are arranged into two concentric rings embedded throughout the gut wall, beginning in the esophagus and ending in the anus. The main function of the ENS is to control the secretory activity of the gastrointestinal glands and peristalsis of the gastrointestinal wall. A large number of organs derived from the developing foregut also receive input from the vagus nerve, which also works in tandem with the ENS to control gastrointestinal function.

== Development ==
The foregut develops from a cranial region of endoderm created after the initial cephalocaudal folding of the embryo. Starting at the stomodeum, a rapid expansion of the primitive gut forms the esophagus, from which the respiratory bud branches off. During early foregut development, the esophagus lengthens considerably, reaching its proportional postnatal size. Simultaneously, the stomach begins to expand in width dorsally and ventrally in an asymmetric manner. This asymmetric expansion creates two curvatures, with the ventral side creating the lesser curvature and the dorsal side creating the greater curvature. The expanding dorsal stomach wall then rotates the on its transverse plane, pulling its caudal portion upward and forcing the upper duodenum into a C shape. This rotation positions the left vagus nerve anteriorly and right vagus nerve posteriorly.

While the hindgut and midgut are only attached dorsally to the body wall by a fold of peritoneum, the foregut also has a ventral attachment. Its two attachments are commonly referred to as the dorsal mesogastrium and the ventral mesogastrium.

As the stomach rotates during early development, the dorsal and ventral mesentery rotate with it; this rotation produces a space anterior to the expanding stomach called the greater sac, and a space posterior to the stomach called the lesser sac. After this rotation the dorsal mesentery thins and forms the greater omentum, which is attached to the greater curvature of the stomach. The ventral mesentery forms the lesser omentum, and is attached to the developing liver. In the adult, these connective structures of omentum and mesentery form the peritoneum, and act as an insulating and protective layer while also supplying organs with blood and lymph vessels as well as nerves. Arterial supply to all these structures is from the celiac trunk, and venous drainage is by the portal venous system. Lymph from these organs is drained to the prevertebral celiac nodes at the origin of the celiac artery from the aorta.

=== Signalling pathways ===
In vertebrates, functional differentiation continues even after birth, with the transformation into the adult phenotype occurring through epithelial–mesenchymal transition. Patterning events that determine tissue differentiation in vertebrates rely on several hox genes, the morphogen sonic hedgehog, and transcription factors such as sox2 and sox9. Recent research has suggested that most foregut malformations are due to defects in these signalling pathways, with sonic hedgehog gene knockout mice showing phenotypes similar to those seen in patients with esophageal atresia/stenosis, tracheo-esophageal fistula, and respiratory tract anomalies.

== Clinical significance ==
- Esophageal atresia is a congenital defect of the digestive system in which the continuity of the esophageal wall is interrupted. In most cases, the upper esophagus fails to connect with the lower esophagus and stomach.
- Esophageal stricture is the narrowing of the esophagus resulting in swallowing difficulties.
- Pyloric stenosis is the thickening (hypertrophy) of the muscle that forms the pyloric sphincter, obstructing the passage of food.
- Biliary atresia is a congenital defect where the common bile duct, which connects the small intestine to the liver, is obstructed or absent.
- Pancreatic disease exist as both congenital and acquired diseases. Two of the well known types of congenital defect are: Pancreatic divisum, where the pancreatic duct fails to form, and Annular pancreas, where extra pancreatic tissue grows and wraps around the duodenum leading to obstruction by constriction.
