= List of diseases (H) =

This is a list of diseases starting with the letter "H".

== Ha ==
=== Hag–Ham ===
- Hageman factor deficiency
- Hagemoser–Weinstein–Bresnick syndrome
- Hailey–Hailey disease
- Hair defect with photosensitivity and mental retardation
- Hairy cell leukemia
- Hairy ears, y-linked
- Hairy ears
- Hairy nose tip
- Hairy palms and soles
- Hairy tongue
- Hajdu–Cheney syndrome
- Halal–Setton–Wang syndrome
- Halal syndrome
- Hall–Riggs mental retardation syndrome
- Hallermann–Streiff syndrome
- Hallervorden–Spatz disease (renamed to Pantothenate kinase-associated neurodegeneration due to Hallervorden's Nazi party associations)
- Hallucinogen persisting perception disorder
- Hallux valgus
- Hamanishi–Ueba–Tsuji syndrome
- Hamano–Tsukamoto syndrome
- Hamartoma sebaceus of Jadassohn

=== Han–Hay ===
- Hantavirus
- Hantavirus pulmonary syndrome
- Hand and foot deformity flat facies
- Hand–foot–uterus syndrome
- Hand wringing Rett syndrome
- Hand, foot and mouth disease
- Hand–Schüller–Christian disease
- Hanhart syndrome
- Harding ataxia
- Harlequin type ichthyosis (Also Known As Harlequin Ichthyosis)
- Harpaxophobia
- Harrod–Doman–Keele syndrome
- Hartnup disease
- Hartsfield–Bixler–Demyer syndrome
- Hashimoto struma
- Hashimoto–Pritzker syndrome
- Hashimoto's thyroiditis
- Haspeslagh–Fryns–Muelenaere syndrome
- Hay–Wells syndrome recessive type
- Hay–Wells syndrome

== He ==
=== Hea–Hei ===
- Headache, cluster
- Hearing disorder
- Hearing impairment
- Hearing loss
- Heart aneurysm
- Heart attack
- Heart block progressive, familial
- Heart block
- Heart defect round face congenital retarded development
- Heart defect tongue hamartoma polysyndactyly
- Heart defects limb shortening
- Heart hand syndrome Spanish type
- Heart hypertrophy, hereditary
- Heart situs anomaly
- Heart tumor of the adult
- Heart tumor of the child
- Heavy metal poisoning
- HEC syndrome
- Hecht–Scott syndrome
- Heckenlively syndrome
- Heide syndrome

=== Hel ===
- Heliophobia
- HELLP syndrome
- Helmerhorst–Heaton–Crossen syndrome
- Helminthiasis

=== Hem ===
- HEM dysplasia

==== Hema–Hemi ====
- Hemangioblastoma
- Hemangioendothelioma
- Hemangioma thrombocytopenia syndrome
- Hemangioma, capillary infantile
- Hemangioma
- Hemangiomatosis, familial pulmonary capillary
- Hemangiopericytoma
- Hematocolpos
- Hemeralopia, congenital essential
- Hemeralopia, familial
- Hemi 3 syndrome
- Hemifacial atrophy agenesis of the caudate nucleus
- Hemifacial atrophy progressive
- Hemifacial hyperplasia strabismus
- Hemifacial microsomia
- Hemihypertrophy in context of NF
- Hemihypertrophy intestinal web corneal opacity
- Hemimegalencephaly
- Hemiplegia
- Hemiplegic migraine, familial

==== Hemo ====
- Hemochromatosis
  - Hemochromatosis type 1
  - Hemochromatosis type 2
  - Hemochromatosis type 3
  - Hemochromatosis type 4
- Hemoglobin C disease
- Hemoglobin E disease
- Hemoglobin SC disease
- Hemoglobinopathy
- Hemoglobinuria
- Hemolytic anemia lethal genital anomalies
- Hemolytic-uremic syndrome
- Hemophagocytic lymphohistiocytosis
- Hemophagocytic reticulosis
- Hemophilia A
- Hemophilia B
- Hemophilic arthropathy
- Hemophobia
- Hemorrhagic fever with renal syndrome
- Hemorrhoid
- Hemorrhagic proctocolitis
- Hemorrhagic thrombocythemia
- Hemorrhagiparous thrombocytic dystrophy
- Hemosiderosis
- Hemothorax

=== Hen ===
- Hennekam–Beemer syndrome
- Hennekam–Koss–de Geest syndrome
- Hennekam syndrome
- Hennekam–Van der Horst syndrome
- Henoch–Schönlein purpura

=== Hep ===
- Hepadnovirus D
- Heparane sulfamidase deficiency
- Heparin-induced thrombopenia
- Hepatic cystic hamartoma
- Hepatic ductular hypoplasia
- Hepatic encephalopathy
- Hepatic fibrosis renal cysts mental retardation
- Hepatic fibrosis
- Hepatic venoocclusive disease
- Hepatic veno-occlusive disease
- Hepatitis
- Hepatitis A
- Hepatitis B
- Hepatitis C
- Hepatitis D
- Hepatitis E
- Hepatoblastoma
- Hepatocellular carcinoma
- Hepatorenal syndrome
- Hepatorenal tyrosinemia

=== Her ===
- Herpes

==== Here ====
===== Hered =====
====== Heredi ======
Hereditary a – Hereditary m

- Hereditary amyloidosis
- Hereditary angioedema
- Hereditary ataxia
- Hereditary breast–ovarian cancer syndrome
- Hereditary carnitine deficiency myopathy
- Hereditary carnitine deficiency syndrome
- Hereditary carnitine deficiency
- Hereditary ceroid lipofuscinosis
- Hereditary coproporphyria
- Hereditary deafness
- Hereditary elliptocytosis
- Hereditary fibrinogen Aα-Chain amyloidosis
- Hereditary fructose intolerance
- Hereditary hearing disorder
- Hereditary hearing loss
- Hereditary hemochromatosis
- Hereditary hemorrhagic telangiectasia
- Hereditary hyperuricemia
- Hereditary macrothrombocytopenia
- Hereditary methemoglobinemia, recessive
- Hereditary myopathy with intranuclear filamentous

Hereditary n – Hereditary t

- Hereditary nodular heterotopia
- Hereditary non-spherocytic hemolytic anemia
- Hereditary pancreatitis
- Hereditary paroxysmal cerebral ataxia
- Hereditary peripheral nervous disorder
- Hereditary primary Fanconi disease
- Hereditary resistance to anti-vitamin K
- Hereditary sensory and autonomic neuropathy 3
- Hereditary sensory and autonomic neuropathy 4
- Hereditary sensory neuropathy type I
- Hereditary sensory neuropathy type II
- Hereditary spastic paraplegia
- Hereditary spherocytic hemolytic anemia
- Hereditary spherocytosis
- Hereditary type 1 neuropathy
- Hereditary type 2 neuropathy

==== Herm–Hers ====
- Hermansky–Pudlak syndrome
- Hermaphroditism
- Hernandez–Aguire–Negrete syndrome
- Herpangina
- Herpes encephalitis
- Herpes simplex disease
- Herpes simplex encephalitis
- Herpes viridae disease
- Herpes virus antenatal infection
- Herpes zoster oticus
- Herpes zoster
- Herpesvirus simiae B virus
- Herpetic embryopathy
- Herpetic keratitis
- Herpetophobia
- Herrmann–Opitz arthrogryposis syndrome
- Herrmann–Opitz craniosynostosis
- Hers' disease
- Hersh–Podruch–Weisskopk syndrome

=== Het–Hex ===
- Heterophobia
- Heterotaxia (generic term)
- Heterotaxia autosomal dominant type
- Heterotaxy with polysplenia or asplenia
- Heterotaxy, visceral, X-linked
- Hexosaminidases A and B deficiency

== Hh ==
- HHH syndrome

== Hi ==
=== Hib–Hip ===
- Hibernian fever, familial
- Hiccups
- Hidradenitis suppurativa familial
- Hidradenitis suppurativa
- Hidrotic ectodermal dysplasia type Christianson Fouris
- High scapula
- High-molecular-weight kininogen deficiency, congenital
- Hillig syndrome
- Hing–Torack–Dowston syndrome
- Hinson–Pepys disease
- Hip dislocation
- Hip dysplasia Beukes type
- Hip dysplasia (canine)
- Hip dysplasia (human)
- Hip luxation
- Hip subluxation
- Hipo syndrome

=== Hir–Hiv ===
- Hirschsprung disease
  - Hirschsprung disease ganglioneuroblastoma
  - Hirschsprung disease polydactyly heart disease
  - Hirschsprung disease type 2
  - Hirschsprung disease type 3
  - Hirschsprung disease type d brachydactyly
  - Hirschsprung microcephaly cleft palate
  - Hirschsprung nail hypoplasia dysmorphism
- Hirsutism congenital gingival hyperplasia
- Hirsutism skeletal dysplasia mental retardation
- His bundle tachycardia
- Histadelia
- Histapenia
- Histidinemia
- Histidinuria renal tubular defect syndrome
- Histiocytosis X
- Histiocytosis, Non-Langerhans-Cell
- Histoplasmosis
- Histrionic personality disorder
- Hittner–Hirsch–Kreh syndrome
- HIV

== Hm ==
- Hm syndrome
- HMG-CoA lyase deficiency
- HMG CoA synthetase deficiency

== Ho ==
=== Hod–Hol ===
- Hodgkin lymphoma
- Hodgkin's disease
- Hoepffner–Dreyer–Reimers syndrome
- Hollow visceral myopathy
- Holmes–Benacerraf syndrome
- Holmes–Borden syndrome
- Holmes–Collins syndrome
- Holmes–Gang syndrome
- Holoacardius amorphus
- Holocarboxylase synthetase deficiency
- Holoprosencephaly caudal dysgenesis
- Holoprosencephaly deletion 2p
- Holoprosencephaly ectrodactyly cleft lip palate
- Holoprosencephaly radial heart renal anomalies
- Holoprosencephaly
- Holt–Oram syndrome
- Holzgreve–Wagner–Rehder syndrome

=== Hom–Hoy ===
- Homocarnosinase deficiency
- Homocarnosinosis
- Homocystinuria due to cystathionine beta-synthase
- Homocystinuria due to defect in methylation (cbl g)
- Homocystinuria due to defect in methylation cbl e
- Homocystinuria due to defect in methylation, MTHFR deficiency
- Homocystinuria
- Homologous wasting disease
- Homozygous hypobetalipoproteinemia
- Hoon–Hall syndrome
- Hordnes–Engebretsen–Knudtson syndrome
- Horn–Kolb syndrome
- Horner's syndrome
- Hornova–Dlurosova syndrome
- Horseshoe kidney
- Horton disease, juvenile
- Horton disease
- Hot tub folliculitis
- Houlston–Ironton–Temple syndrome
- Howard–Young syndrome
- Howel–Evans syndrome
- Hoyeraal–Hreidarsson syndrome
- Hoyeraal syndrome

== Hs ==
- HSV-2 infection

== Hu ==
- Human ewingii ehrlichiosis
- Human granulocytic ehrlichiosis
- Human monocytic ehrlichiosis
- Human parvovirus B19 infection
- Humero spinal dysostosis congenital heart disease
- Humeroradial synostosis
- Humeroradioulnar synostosis
- Humerus trochlea aplasia of
- Hunter–Carpenter–Mcdonald syndrome
- Hunter–Jurenka–Thompson syndrome
- Hunter–Macpherson syndrome
- Hunter–Mcalpine syndrome
- Hunter–Mcdonald syndrome
- Hunter–Rudd–Hoffmann syndrome
- Hunter syndrome
- Huntington's disease
- Huriez scleroatrophic syndrome
- Hurler syndrome
- Hurst–Hallam–Hockey syndrome
- Hutchinson–Gilford–Progeria syndrome
- Hutchinson incisors
- Hutteroth–Spranger syndrome

== Hy ==
=== Hya ===
- Hyalinosis systemic short stature
- Hyaloideoretinal degeneration of wagner

=== Hyd ===
==== Hyda–Hyde ====
- Hydantoin antenatal infection
- Hydatidiform mole
- Hydatidosis
- Hyde–Forster–Mccarthy–Berry syndrome

==== Hydr ====
- Hydranencephaly
- Hydrocephalus - Arnold Chiari - allied disorders
- Hydrocephalus autosomal recessive
- Hydrocephalus costovertebral dysplasia Sprengel anomaly
- Hydrocephalus craniosynostosis bifid nose
- Hydrocephalus endocardial fibroelastosis cataract
- Hydrocephalus growth retardation skeletal anomalies
- Hydrocephalus obesity hypogonadism
- Hydrocephalus skeletal anomalies
- Hydrocephalus
- Hydrocephaly corpus callosum agenesis diaphragmatic hernia
- Hydrocephaly low insertion umbilicus
- Hydrocephaly tall stature joint laxity
- Hydrolethalus syndrome
- Hydronephrosis
- Hydronephrosis peculiar facial expression
- Hydrophobia
- Hydrops ectrodactyly syndactyly
- Hydrops fetalis anemia immune disorder absent thumb
- Hydrops fetalis
- Hydroxycarboxylic aciduria
- Hydroxymethylglutaric aciduria

=== Hyg-Hym ===
- Hygroma cervical
- Hymenolepiasis

=== Hyp ===
==== Hyper ====
- Hyper IgE
- Hyper IgM syndrome

===== Hypera–Hyperb =====
- Hyperadrenalism
- Hyperaldosteronism familial type 2
- Hyperaldosteronism, familial type 1
- Hyperaldosteronism
- Hyperammonemia
- Hyperandrogenism
- Hyperbilirubinemia transient familial neonatal
- Hyperbilirubinemia type 1
- Hyperbilirubinemia type 2
- Hyperbilirubinemia

===== Hyperc–Hyperg =====
- Hypercalcemia, familial benign type 1
- Hypercalcemia, familial benign type 2
- Hypercalcemia, familial benign type 3
- Hypercalcemia, familial benign
- Hypercalcemia
- Hypercalcinuria idiopathic
- Hypercalcinuria macular coloboma
- Hypercalcinuria
- Hypercementosis
- Hypercholesterolemia due to arg3500 mutation of Apo B-100
- Hypercholesterolemia due to LDL receptor deficiency
- Hypercholesterolemia
- Hyperchylomicronemia
- Hyperekplexia
- Hypereosinophilic syndrome
- Hyperferritinemia, hereditary, with congenital cataracts
- Hypergeusia
- Hyperglycemia
- Hyperglycerolemia
- Hyperglycinemia, isolated nonketotic type 1
- Hyperglycinemia, isolated nonketotic type 2
- Hyperglycinemia, isolated nonketotic
- Hyperglycinemia, ketotic
- Hyperglycinemia, non-ketotic
- Hypergonadotropic ovarian failure, familial or sporadic

===== Hyperh–Hyperk =====
- Hyperhidrosis
- Hyperhomocysteinemia
- Hyper-IgD syndrome
- Hyperimidodipeptiduria
- Hyperimmunoglobinemia D with recurrent fever
- Hyperimmunoglobulin E - recurrent infection syndrome
- Hyperimmunoglobulinemia D with periodic fever
- Hyperimmunoglobulinemia E
- Hyperinsulinism due to focal adenomatous hyperplasia
- Hyperinsulinism due to glucokinase deficiency
- Hyperinsulinism due to glutamodehydrogenase deficiency
- Hyperinsulinism in children, congenital
- Hyperinsulinism, diffuse
- Hyperinsulinism, focal
- Hyperkalemia
- Hyperkalemic periodic paralysis
- Hyperkeratosis lenticularis perstans of Flegel
- Hyperkeratosis lenticularis perstans
- Hyperkeratosis palmoplantar localized acanthokeratolytic
- Hyperkeratosis palmoplantar localized epidermolytic
- Hyperkeratosis palmoplantar with palmar crease hyperkeratosis

===== Hyperl–Hypero =====
- Hyperlipoproteinemia type I
- Hyperlipoproteinemia type II
- Hyperlipoproteinemia type III
- Hyperlipoproteinemia type IV
- Hyperlipoproteinemia type V
- Hyperlipoproteinemia
- Hyperlysinemia
- Hyperopia
- Hyperornithinemia
- Hyperornithinemia, hyperammonemia, homocitrullinuria syndrome
- Hyperostosid corticalis deformans juvenilis
- Hyperostosis cortical infantile
- Hyperostosis corticalis generalisata
- Hyperostosis frontalis interna
- Hyperoxaluria type 1
- Hyperoxaluria type 2
- Hyperoxaluria

===== Hyperp–Hypers =====
- Hyperparathyroidism
- Hyperparathyroidism, familial, primary
- Hyperparathyroidism, neonatal severe primary
- Hyperphalangism dysmorphy bronchomalacia
- Hyperphenylalaninemia
- Hyperphenylalaninemia due to pterin-4-alpha-carbin
- Hyperphenylalaninemia due to dihydropteridine reductase deficiency
- Hyperphenylalaninemia due to 6-pyruvoyltetrahydrop
- Hyperphenylalaninemia due to dehydratase deficiency
- Hyperphenylalaninemia due to GTP cyclohydrolase deficiency
- Hyperphenylalaninemic embryopathy
- Hyperpipecolatemia
- Hyperprolactinemia
- Hyperprolinemia type II
- Hyperprolinemia
- Hyperreflexia
- Hyper-reninism
- Hypersensitivity

- Hypersensitivity type I
- Hypersensitivity type II
- Hypersensitivity type III
- Hypersensitivity type IV

- Hypersomnolence

===== Hypert–Hyperv =====
- Hypertelorism and tetralogy of Fallot
- Hypertelorism hypospadias syndrome
- Hypertension
- Hypertensive hyperkalemia, familial
- Hypertensive hypokalemia familial
- Hypertensive retinopathy
- Hyperthermia induced defects
- Hyperthermia
- Hyperthyroidism
- Hyperthyroidism due to mutations in TSH receptor
- Hypertrichosis atrophic skin ectropion macrostomia
- Hypertrichosis brachydactyly obesity and mental retardation
- Hypertrichosis congenital generalized X linked
- Hypertrichosis lanuginosa congenita
- Hypertrichosis lanuginosa, acquired
- Hypertrichosis retinopathy dysmorphism
- Hypertrichosis, anterior cervical
- Hypertrichotic osteochondrodysplasia
- Hypertriglycidemia
- Hypertrophic branchial myopathy
- Hypertrophic cardiomyopathy
- Hypertrophic hemangiectasia
- Hypertrophic myocardiopathy
- Hypertrophic osteoarthropathy, primary or idiopathic
- Hypertropia
- Hypertropic neuropathy of Dejerine-Sottas
- Hypertryptophanemia
- Hypervitaminosis A
- Hypervitaminosis D
- Hypervitaminosis E

==== Hypo ====
===== Hypoa–Hypof =====
- Hypoactive sexual desire disorder
- Hypoadrenalism
- Hypoadrenocorticism hypoparathyroidism moniliasis
- Hypoaldosteronism
- Hypo-alphalipoproteinemia primary
- Hypobetalipoproteinaemia ataxia hearing loss
- Hypobetalipoprotéinemia, familial
- Hypocalcemia, autosomal dominant
- Hypocalcemia
- Hypocalciuric hypercalcemia, familial
- Hypochondriasis
- Hypochondrogenesis
- Hypochondroplasia
- Hypocomplementemic urticarial vasculitis
- Hypodermyasis
- Hypodontia dysplasia of nails
- Hypodontia of incisors and premolars
- Hypodysfibrinogenemia
- Hypofibrinogenemia, familial

===== Hypog–Hypol =====
- Hypoglycemia with deficiency of glycogen synthetase in the liver
- Hypoglycemia
- Hypogonadism cardiomyopathy
- Hypogonadism hypogonadotropic due to mutations in GR hormone
- Hypogonadism male mental retardation skeletal anomaly
- Hypogonadism mitral valve prolapse mental retardation
- Hypogonadism primary partial alopecia
- Hypogonadism retinitis pigmentosa
- Hypogonadism, isolated, hypogonadotropic
- Hypogonadism
- Hypogonadotropic hypogonadism syndactyly
- Hypogonadotropic hypogonadism without anosmia, X linked
- Hypogonadotropic hypogonadism-anosmia, X linked
- Hypogonadotropic hypogonadism-anosmia
- Hypohidrotic Ectodermal Dysplasia
- Hypokalemia
- Hypokalemic alkalosis with hypercalcinuria
- Hypokalemic periodic paralysis
- Hypokalemic periodic paralysis type 1
- Hypokalemic sensory overstimulation
- Hypoketonemic hypoglycemia
- Hypolipoproteinemia

===== Hypom =====
- Hypomagnesemia primary
- Hypomandibular faciocranial dysostosis
- Hypomelanotic disorder
- Hypomelia Müllerian duct anomalies
- Hypomentia

===== Hypop =====
- Hypoparathyroidism familial isolated
- Hypoparathyroidism nerve deafness nephrosis
- Hypoparathyroidism short stature mental retardation
- Hypoparathyroidism short stature
- Hypoparathyroidism X linked
- Hypoparathyroidism
- Hypophosphatasia, infantile
- Hypophosphatasia
- Hypophosphatemic rickets
- Hypopigmentation oculocerebral syndrome Cross type
- Hypopituitarism micropenis cleft lip palate
- Hypopituitarism postaxial polydactyly
- Hypopituitarism
- Hypopituitary dwarfism
- Hypoplasia hepatic ductular
- Hypoplasia of the tibia with polydactyly
- Hypoplastic left heart syndrome
- Hypoplastic right heart microcephaly
- Hypoplastic thumb Müllerian aplasia
- Hypoplastic thumbs hydranencephaly
- Hypoproconvertinemia
- Hypoprothrombinemia

===== Hypor–Hypox =====
- Hyporeninemic hypoaldosteronism
- Hyposmia nasal hypoplasia hypogonadism
- Hypospadias familial
- Hypospadias mental retardation Goldblatt type
- Hyposplenism
- Hypotelorism cleft palate hypospadias
- Hypothalamic dysfunction
- Hypothalamic hamartoblastoma syndrome
- Hypothalamic hamartomas
- Hypertonic gingivitus
- Hypothermia
- Hypothyroidism due to iodide transport defect
- Hypothyroidism postaxial polydactyly mental retardation
- Hypothyroidism
- Hypotonic sclerotic muscular dystrophy
- Hypotrichosis mental retardation Lopes type
- Hypotrichosis
- Hypotropia
- Hypoxanthine guanine phosphoribosyltransferase deficiency
- Hypoxia
