= Contiguous gene syndrome =

Combined clinical phenotype caused by each gene involved in a chromosomal abnormality

A contiguous gene syndrome (CGS), also known as a contiguous gene deletion syndrome, is a clinical phenotype caused by a chromosomal abnormality, such as a deletion or duplication that removes several genes lying in close proximity to one another on the chromosome. The combined phenotype of the patient is a combination of what is seen when any individual has disease-causing mutations in any of the individual genes involved in the deletion. While it can be caused by deleted material on a chromosome, it is not, strictly speaking, the same entity as a segmental aneuploidy syndrome. A segmental aneuploidy syndrome is a subtype of CGS that regularly recur, usually due to non-allelic homologous recombination between low copy repeats in the region. Most CGS involve the X chromosome and affect male individuals.

One of the earliest and most famous examples of a CGS involves a male patient with Duchenne muscular dystrophy (DMD), chronic granulomatous disease (CGD), retinitis pigmentosa and intellectual disability. When it was discovered that an X chromosome deletion (specifically Xp21) was the underlying cause of all of these features, researchers were able to use this information to clone the genes responsible for DMD and CGD.

One of those more common CGS involves a deletion on the X chromosome (near Xp21) that encompasses DMD (causing Duchenne muscular dystrophy), NROB1 (causing X-linked adrenal hypoplasia congenita) and GK (causing glycerol kinase deficiency). These patients will have all the common features of each individual disease, resulting in a very complex phenotype. Deletions near the distal tip of the p arm of the X chromosome are also a frequent cause of CGS. In addition to the previously described CGS that occur on the X chromosome, two other common syndromes are Langer–Giedion syndrome (caused by deletions of TRPS1 and EXT1 on 8q24 and WAGR syndrome (caused by deletions on 11q13 encompassing PAX6 and WT1.)
