= Hyperglycerolemia =

Genetic disorder

- Specialty: Medical genetics

Hyperglycerolemia, also known as glycerol kinase deficiency (GKD), is a genetic disorder where the enzyme glycerol kinase is deficient resulting in a build-up of glycerol in the body. Glycerol kinase is responsible for synthesizing triglycerides and glycerophospholipids in the body. Excess amounts of glycerol can be found in the blood and/ or urine. Hyperglycerolmia occurs more frequently in males. Hyperglycerolemia is listed as a "rare disease", which means it affects less than 200,000 people in the US population, or less than about 1 in 1500 people.

== Signs and symptoms ==
The Human Phenotype Ontology provided the following list of symptoms and signs for hyperglycerolemia: Abnormality of metabolism/homeostasis, cognitive deficit, EMG abnormality, muscular hypotonia, myopathy, neurological speech impairment, primary adrenal insufficiency, short stature, cryptorchidism, EEG abnormality, lumbar hyperlordosis, reduced bone mineral density, scoliosis, seizures, abnormal facial shape, and adrenal insufficiency. Adrenal insufficiency is associated with the genetic disease X-linked adrenal hypoplasia congenita. If the glycerol kinase gene is deleted then the NROB1 gene is also often deleted, which causes X-linked adrenal hypoplasia congenita.

== Cause ==
Hyperglycerolemia is caused by excess glycerol in the bloodstream. People with more severe cases of glycerol kinase deficiency may have a deletion of the GK gene that is large enough to see by routine cytogenetic evaluation. It has been found an X-linked recessive inheritance pattern of the trait when a study was conducted on a grandfather and grandson. In addition, there is a high prevalence of [diabetes mellitus] in this family. There is no known prevention for hyperglycerolemia because it is caused by a mutation or deletion of an individual's genetic code.

== Mechanism ==
Hyperglycerolemia or glycerol kinase deficiency, is caused by a rare X-linked recessive genetic disorder caused by a mutation or a deletion in the glycerol kinase gene, located at the locus Xp21.3 of the X chromosome between base pairs 30,653,358 to 30,731,461. Glycerol kinase catalyzes the phosphorylation of glycerol by ATP, yielding ADP and glycerol-3-phosphate. It is more common in males because they only have one X chromosome, whereas females rarely manifest the disease because they have two X chromosomes. If hyperglycerolemia is caused by a mutation in the glycerol kinase gene then it generally causes an isolated glycerol kinase deficiency, resulting in the inability to synthesize triglycerides and glycerophospholipids. If hyperglycerolemia results from a deletion of the glycerol kinase gene then it often is part of a contiguous gene deletion syndrome with associated Duchenne muscular dystrophy and adrenal hypoplasia congenita.

== Diagnosis ==
Glycerol and glycerol kinase activity analyses are usually not offered by routine general medical laboratories. To diagnose hyperglycerolemia, blood and urine can be tested for the amounts of glycerol present. There are three clinical forms of GKD: infantile, juvenile, and adult. The infantile form is associated with severe developmental delay and results in a syndrome with Xp21 gene deletion with congenital adrenal hypoplasia and/or Duchenne muscular dystrophy. The infantile diagnosis is made by measuring plasma glycerol and is characterized by glycerol levels between 1.8 and 8.0 mmol/L and glyceroluria more than 360 mmol/24h. To confirm the diagnosis, genetic testing of the Xp21 gene is definitive. Children with GKD have severe hypoglycemic episodes and profound metabolic acidosis, or are completely symptom free. Individuals who are unable to form glucose from the glycerol released during triglyceride catabolism also the hypoglycemic episodes often disappear during adolescence. Patients with the juvenile and adult forms often have no symptoms and are diagnosed fortuitously when a medical professional tests for another medical condition. The juvenile form is an uncommon form characterized by Reye syndrome-like clinical manifestations including episodic vomiting, acidemia, and disorders of consciousness.

== Treatment ==
In adults, fibrates and statins have been prescribed to treat hyperglycerolemia by lowering blood glycerol levels. Fibrates are a class of drugs that are known as amphipathic carboxylic acids that are often used in combination with statins. Fibrates work by lowering blood triglyceride concentrations. When combined with statins, the combination will lower LDL cholesterol, lower blood triglycerides and increase HDL cholesterol levels. If hyperglycerolemia is found in a young child without any family history of this condition, then it may be difficult to know whether the young child has the symptomatic or benign form of the disorder. Common treatments include: a low-fat diet, IV glucose if necessary, monitor for insulin resistance and diabetes, evaluate for Duchenne muscular dystrophy, adrenal insufficiency & developmental delay. The Genetic and Rare Diseases Information Center (GARD) does not list any treatments at this time.

== Research ==
According to Clinicaltrials.gov, there are no current studies on hyperglycerolemia. Clinicaltrials.gov is a service of the U.S. National Institutes of Health. Recent research shows patients with high concentrations of blood triglycerides have an increased risk of coronary heart disease. Normally, a blood glycerol test is not ordered. The research was about a child having elevated levels of triglycerides when in fact the child had glycerol kinase deficiency. This condition is known as pseudo-hypertriglyceridemia, a falsely elevated condition of triglycerides. Another group treated patients with elevated concentrations of blood triglycerides with little or no effect on reducing the triglycerides. A few laboratories can test for high concentrations of glycerol, and some laboratories can compare a glycerol-blanked triglycerides assay with the routine non-blanked method. Both cases show how the human body may exhibit features suggestive of a medical disorder when in fact it is another medical condition causing the issue.

== See also ==
- Hypertriglyceridemia
