= Ear hair =

Hair growing on the human ear

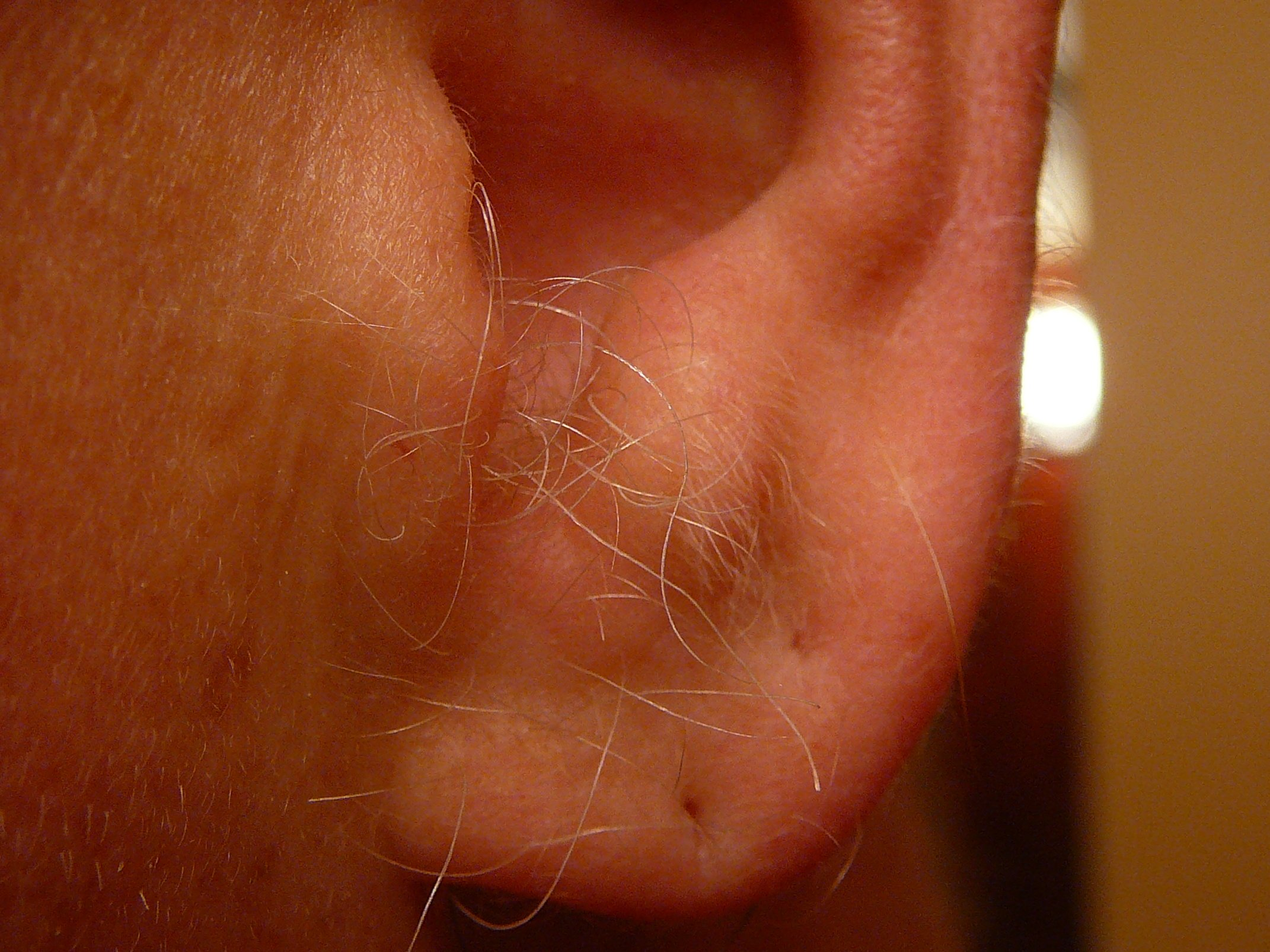
Ear hair protruding from the external auditory meatus in a middle-aged male. Note the fine vellus hair growth on the antitragus and helix.

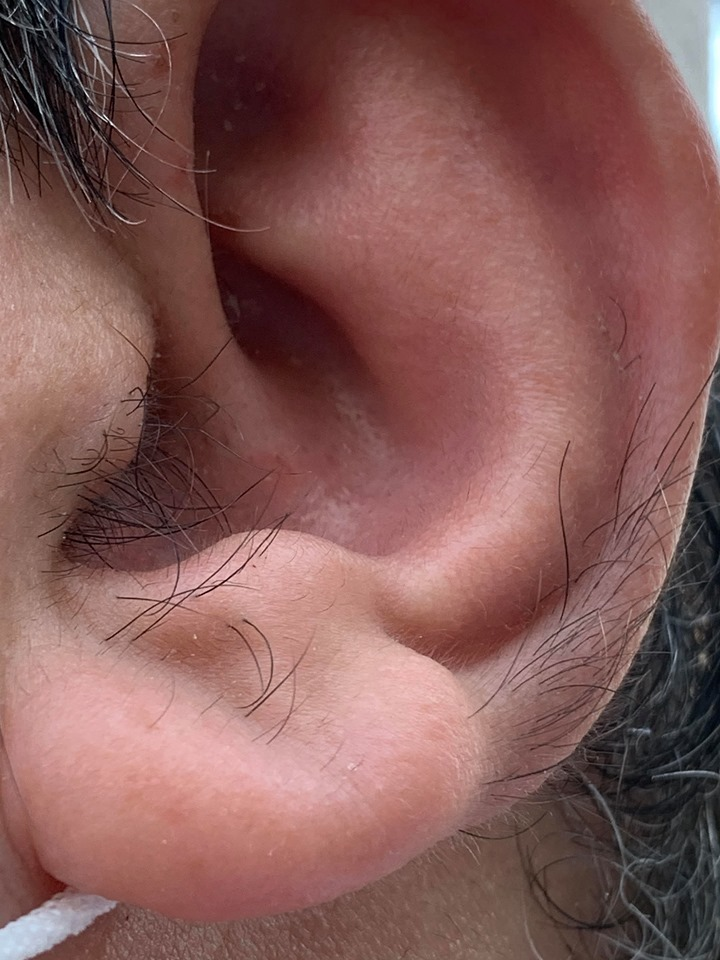
Ear hair protruding from the external auditory meatus in a middle-aged male.

Ear hair is the terminal hair arising from follicular cartilage inside the external auditory meatus in humans. In its broader sense, ear hair may also include the fine vellus hair covering much of the ear, particularly at the prominent parts of the anterior ear, or even the abnormal hair growth as seen in hypertrichosis and hirsutism. Medical research on the function of ear hair is currently very scarce.

Hair growth within the ear canal is often observed to increase in older men, together with increased growth of nasal hair. Visible hair that protrudes from the ear canal is sometimes trimmed for cosmetic reasons. Excessive hair growth within or on the ear is known medically as auricular hypertrichosis. Some men, particularly in the male population of India, have coarse hair growth along the lower portion of the helix, a condition referred to as "having hairy pinnae" (hypertrichosis lanuginosa acquisita).

== Structure ==
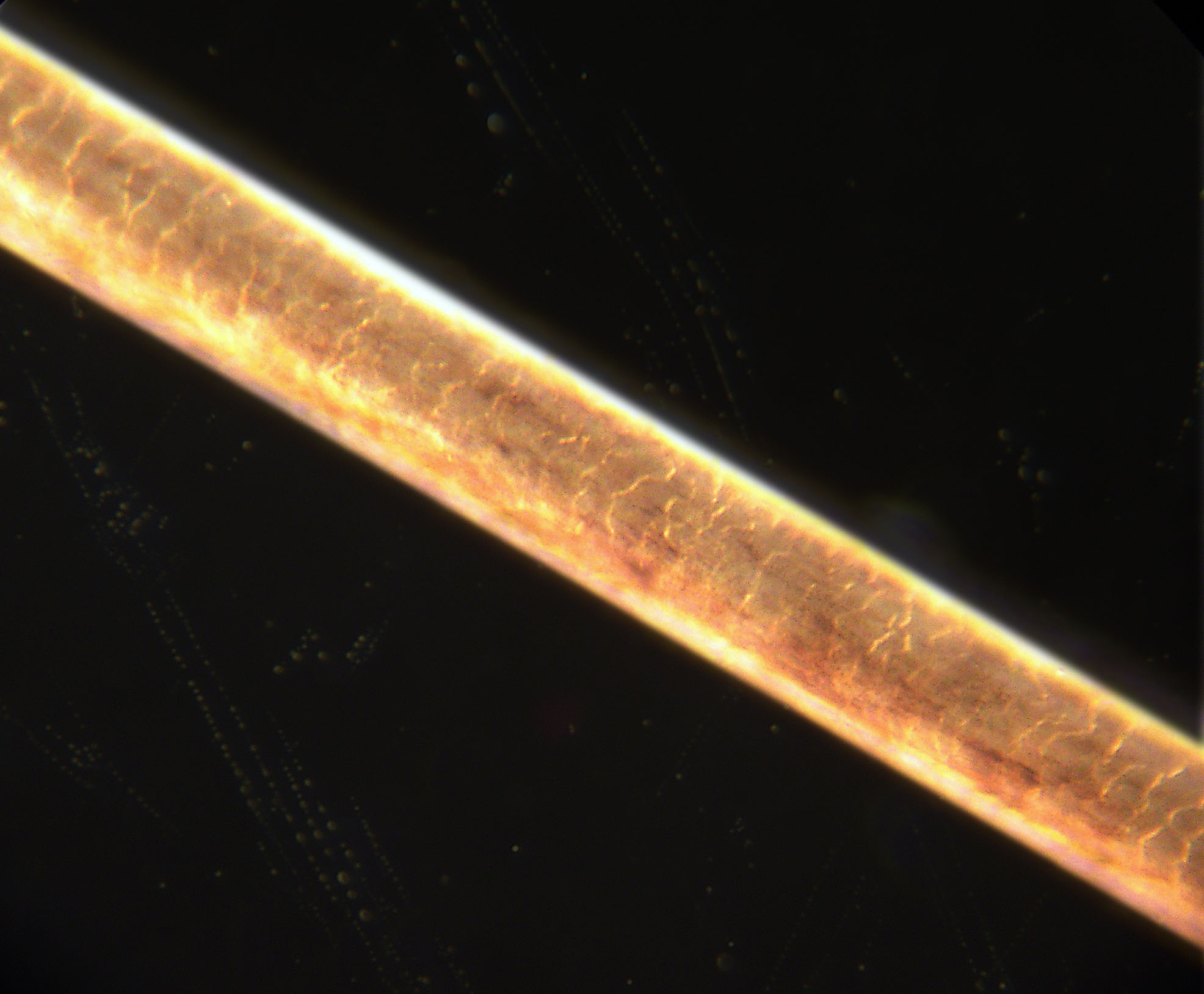
Strand of human hair at 200× magnification

Hair is a protein filament that grows from follicles in the dermis, or skin. With the exception of areas of glabrous skin, the human body is covered in follicles which produce thick terminal and fine vellus hair. It is an important biomaterial primarily composed of protein, notably keratin.

== Clinical significance ==
- Hair that migrates so that it touches the eardrum may cause tinnitus.
- Folliculitis of ear hair may cause acute and localized otitis externa.
- Severe hypertrichosis of the external ear during minoxidil therapy, where excessive hair covers the ears, may cause ear canal occlusion, potentially resulting in partial or complete deafness.

== Society and culture ==
Radhakant Bajpai, an Indian grocer, was recognized by Guinness in 2003 as having the longest ear hair in the world, measuring 13.2 cm. In a 2009 interview, when his hair had reached 25 cm, he said that he considered the long ear hair to be a symbol of luck and prosperity.

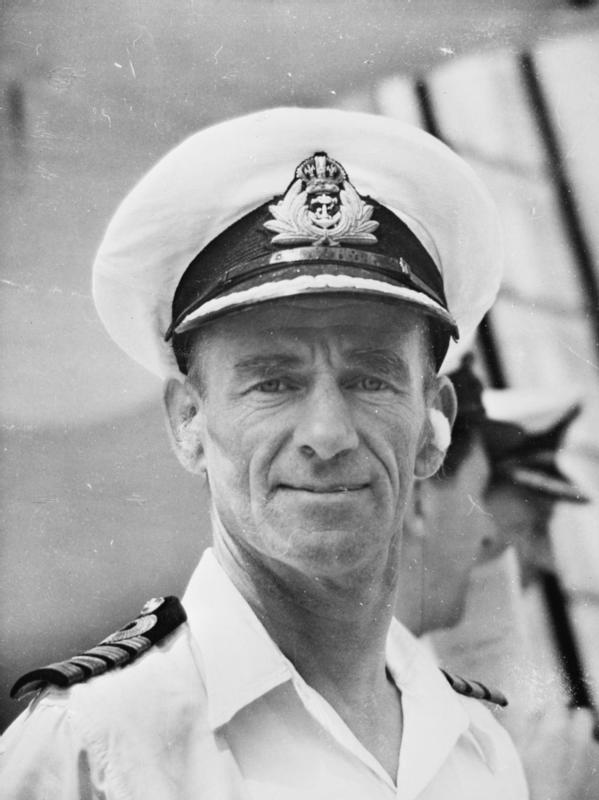
Royal Navy admiral Michael Denny with ear hair

== See also ==
- Hair disease
- Black hairy tongue
- Hypertrichosis
