= Eldad Ben-Chetrit =

Israeli medical professor (born 1949)

- אלדד בן-שטרית
- Born: December 29, 1949 (age 76); Jerusalem, Israel
- Education: Hadassah-Hebrew University Medical School (MD); Scripps Clinic and Research Foundation
- Scientific career
- Workplaces: Hadassah Medical Center

Eldad Ben-Chetrit (Hebrew: אלדד בן-שטרית; born December 29, 1949) is a professor of Medicine, former Head of the Department of Medicine and former director of the Rheumatology unit (2009-2017) at the Hadassah-Hebrew University Medical Center in Jerusalem. He was a visiting professor at the Oklahoma Medical Research Foundation (1996), at the Biochemistry Department, Stanford University (2004), and at the Gaslini Children Hospital (Istituto Giannina Gaslini), University of Genoa, Italy, and the Tropical Medicine Clinic, University of Heidelberg, Germany (2016).

== Education ==
Ben-Chetrit was born on December 29, 1949, in Jerusalem, Israel. He is a graduate of the Hadassah-Hebrew University Medical School in Jerusalem. He completed a specialty and was certified by the Board in Internal Medicine in 1984. Following Internal Medicine, Ben-Chetrit was trained in Rheumatology and Immunology at the Scripps Clinic and Research Foundation (Scripps Research) in La Jolla, California (1986–88). In 1991, he was Board certified in Rheumatology in Israel.

== Research and career ==
Ben-Chetrit did his residency in internal medicine at the Hadassah-Hebrew University Medical School and served there in many roles, up to Head of the Department. In earlier years, his main research interests included: Pathophysiology of Autoimmune diseases, i.e. Systemic lupus erythematosus (SLE), Sjögren's syndrome (SS) and immune-related Congenital heart block. Ben-Chetrit detected a new antigen (52 KD) component of the SSA/Ro (J Exp Med 1988) and cloned the gene encoding the 60 KD component of this antigen (J Clin Invest 1989). In collaboration with colleagues from the Department of Rheumatology at the New York University Medical Center, Ben-Chetrit investigated the relationship between the carriage of anti SSA-Ro /SSB-La antibodies in the mother and the risk for congenital heart block in the fetus or in newborns (J Clin Invest 1989). Currently, Ben-Chetrit's main research interests are the genetics, pathophysiology and therapeutic response of Familial Mediterranean fever (FMF) and Behçet's disease (BD) and other autoinflammatory diseases. He has studied extensively the mechanism of action of Colchicine and its pharmacokinetics. During his work as a member of the French FMF consortium, he participated in identifying the gene associated with FMF (Nat Genet 1997). He also participated in the NIH study which discovered the association of a SNP in the gene encoding IL-10 with Behcet's disease (Nat Genet 2010). Recently, he has been a member of the steering committee of the large trial of Canakinumab (anti IL-1 ab) for its efficacy in the treatment of several autoinflammatory diseases (NEJM 2018) and headed a committee for renaming and revising the definition of autoinflammatory diseases (Ann Rheum Dis 2018).

== Awards and honors ==
- 1979, Faculty of Medicine Prize in Memory of Zohara Levituv, for an outstanding M.D. Thesis, Hebrew University, Israel
- 1983, The Astorre Mayer Prize for Clinical Studies in Cardiovascular Diseases
- 1985, Faculty of Medicine Prize in Memory of Dr. Adam Federgreen, for a Distinguished Study in Clinical Immunology, Hebrew University, Israel
- 1986, Hadassah-Hebrew University Medical School Outstanding Teacher Award
- 1987, The Rheumatology Fellow Award - American Rheumatism Association
- 1988, SYNTEX - Senior Rheumatology Fellow
- 1996, E.K. Gaylord Scholar, Oklahoma Medical Research Foundation, Oklahoma City, OK, USA
- 1996, Hadassah-Hebrew University Medical School Outstanding Teacher Award
- 2003, Hadassah-Hebrew University Medical School Outstanding Teacher Award
- 2004, Hadassah-Hebrew University Medical School Outstanding Teacher Award
- 2004, The Feldman Foundation Fellowship for the Stanford Visiting Professors program
- 2005, The Wilfred P and Rose J Cohen Chair in Internal Medicine, Hadassah Medical Center, Israel
- 2010, The Senior Investigator Award by the International Society for Systemic Autoinflammatory Diseases (6th Conference, Amsterdam, Netherlands)
- 2017, Honorable Member of The Israeli Association of Rheumatology
