= Congenital heart block =

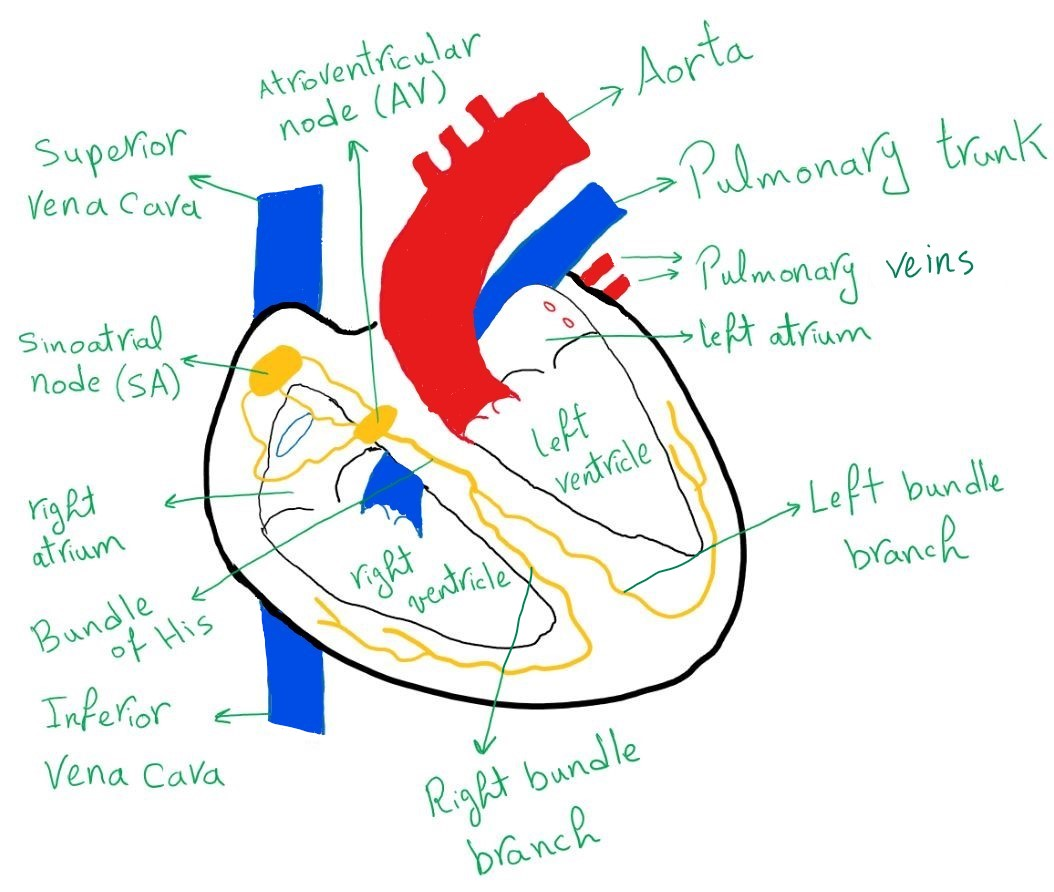
- The conduction system of the heart (shown in yellow)
- Specialty: Medical genetics
- Symptoms: slow heart rate
- Usual onset: in utero.
- Diagnostic method: fetal echocardiogram and Doppler and ELISA for the mother
- Treatment: fluorinated steroids, beta agonists, IVIG, HCQ, pace maker implantation and maternal plasmapheresis.
- Frequency: 1 child in every 15000-20000

The congenital heart block (CHB) is the heart block that is diagnosed in fetus (in utero) or within the first 28 days after birth (neonatal period), some studies also include the diagnosis during early childhood to the definition of CHB. It refers to the disorder in the electrical conduction system within the heart muscle, which leads to the failure in pumping the blood efficiently into the aorta and the pulmonary trunk. The result of CHB can be first, second, or third-degree (complete) atrioventricular block (a block in the atrioventricular node) in which no electric signals move from the atrium to the ventricles

The congenital heart block is a rare disease that affects around 1 child in every 15,000–20,000 births. However, its high mortality (which can be as high as 85% in some severe cases) makes the early diagnosis and intervention very important. CHB can be isolated, where the fetus does not suffer from any other problems, or it can be a result of other diseases either in the child or in the mother.

In most cases, the congenital heart block is associated with other diseases, and therefore, the symptoms vary a lot between patients. However, low heart rate is usually the main clinical presentation that leads to the diagnosis. Also, the treatment varies as well due to the associated diseases and it can be non-invasive (medications given to the pregnant woman or to the child), or a surgery in some cases when the CHB is resulted from anatomical disorders in the heart.

== Presentation ==
The symptoms of the congenital heart block can vary due to the underlying problems that associate / lead to the CHB, and the features of CHB reflects the other manifestations of these diseases.

Bradycardia is usually the first symptom of CHB to be detected in utero. Due to the block in the atrioventricular node, less electric signals move from the sinoatrial node to the bundle of his and its right and left branches, leading to a lower heart rate. The atrioventricular block can be first degree or much more severe like a complete atrioventricular block (third degree). In addition, several changes in the ECG can be detected.

Other manifestations of the congenital heart block can be related to the impact of the maternal autoantibodies in the autoimmune-mediated CHB. Fibrosis of the myocardium (Endocardial fibroelastosis) (EFE) is the obvious one and it occurs due to the damage caused by the maternal autoantibodies to the cardiac tissue of the fetus, and can lead to death in some cases. However, it is not a common feature of CHB.

Another rare symptom that might accompany the autoimmune CHB is the disorder in the valvular function, and this happens due to the damage in the papillary muscles as a result of the maternal autoantibodies.

== Causes ==
In some cases the reason behind CHB remains unknown but in the great majority of affected kids, this disease is associated with the transference of autoantibodies from the mother during gestation or with major cardiac structural abnormalities that lead to a disturbance in the conducting signals in the atrioventricular node. Also, in some rare cases, the congenital heart block was linked with viral infections or treatment with specific medications.

=== Maternal autoimmune disease ===
In the autoimmune-mediated congenital heart block, autoantibodies are passively transferred through the placenta during gestation. The mother might be asymptomatic during or after pregnancy but she is usually positive to anti-Ro\SSA or anti-La\SSB antibodies. In this case, the fetus's heart is normally developed and shows no structural malformations. Just like other autoimmune diseases, the autoimmune CHB shows signs of damage resulted from the autoantibodies attacking the normal tissue of the body, inflammation and fibrosis in the fetal heart tissue are the most common ones, mainly in the atrioventricular node. These antibodies lead to irreversible injuries in the atrioventricular node which heavily compromise the efficiency of the electrical conduction system, and this results in around 18% mortality rate and 70% of the live-born kids will need early pacemaker implantation.

==== Anti-Ro\SSA autoantibody ====
This autoantibody is found in the serum of the majority of kids with autoimmune CHB, and therefore it is the one mostly linked with this disease. It attacks the proteins Ro52 and Ro60 in the antigen Ro\SSA in the fetal heart tissue.

==== Anti-La\SSB autoantibody ====
This antibody attacks the ribonucleoprotein La48 on the surface of the fetal cardiomyocytes, the links between this autoantibody and autoimmune CHB are less strong than the anti-Ro autoantibody and it usually accompanies it in the majority of cases.
Although the autoimmune CHB has a relatively high mortality and morbidity rates, the chance of kids from -mothers positive to anti-Ro\SSA and/or anti-La\SSB antibodies- to suffer from CHB is only around 1-5%, which suggests the existence of other factors to influence the disease such as genetic and environmental factors.

==== Other autoantibodies ====
Several autoantibodies were suggested to have links with the autoimmune CHB, mainly the ones associated with the different autoimmune diseases that are common among women (such as the antibodies associated with Systemic lupus erythematosus (SLE), Rheumatoid arthritis, Progressive systemic sclerosis (PSS), and Mixed connective tissue disease). However, the role of these autoantibodies was not studied comprehensively.

Also, some antigens of the fetal heart tissue (apart from the "Ro" and the "La") were studied, but no clear link with the autoimmune CHB was proven.

=== Congenital cardiac structural abnormalities ===
The presence of a cardiac structural abnormality is a major determination of the outcome of CHB. Its existence affects the conduction system of the heart and increases the mortality rate and the need for pace-maker implantation.

The cardiac structural diseases that are usually associated with the congenital heart block include the left atrial isomerism with or without atrioventricular septal defect. In addition, levo transpositions of the great arteries can accompany CHB but this is less common than the first one.

These developmental abnormalities can impair the conduction system of the heart by disrupting its anatomical structure.

== Diagnosis ==
There is a difference in diagnosis between low risk pregnancies where mothers do not have (or are not aware of) any autoimmune disease, and the high risk ones where mothers are known to have a specific autoimmune disease and / or are positive to anti Ro/La autoantibodies and / or had a CHB-affected pregnancy previously.

In low risk pregnancies, testing the mothers' serum is not part of the routine prenatal tests. Therefore, the congenital heart block is usually diagnosed during a routine obstetrical ultra sound. The first symptom in most cases is a slow heart rate which can be detected using fetal echocardiogram and Doppler ultra sound techniques between the weeks 18 - 30. The Doppler is very important to assess the level of AV block as well as to check for other cardiac structural abnormalities that might be associated with CHB such as left atrial isomerism, valvular damages and big arteries inversion, while the echocardiogram is useful to detect other complications such as the hydrops fetalis. In the absence of cardiac structural diseases, the second step to confirm the diagnosis is to test the serum of the mother for anti Ro/La autoantibodies using the enzyme-linked immunosorbent assay (ELISA).

In high risk pregnancies, the diagnosis is relatively easier as fetal and maternal screenings are part of the routine monitoring of the pregnancy.

== Screening ==
Although the chance of having kids with CHB in anti Ro/La positive mothers is relatively low (1-5%), it is recommended that all mothers with autoimmune disease to be screened and seek consultation when decide to get pregnant.

For mothers with at least one CHB-affected pregnancy, with 16 - 18% recurrence chance for the directly following pregnancy and an overall 9% chance in following ones, monitoring both the mother and the fetus is crucial.

== Treatment ==
Due to the rarity of this disease, there is a lack of comprehensive and high quality research about the different treatment options, and therefore, no specific treatment plan is followed globally. However, some studies have attempted to outline the most widely accepted approaches in dealing with CHB.

=== Fluorinated steroids ===
There is no agreement on using fluorinated steroids in treating CHB, and the results of the different studies are contradictory. These steroids (such as dexamethasone) are used when the disease is diagnosed in utero as they can cross the placenta without being deactivated. The main goal of using corticosteroids is to mitigate the inflammation by decreasing the amount of anti Ro/La autoantibodies in the fetal serum. Therefore, they are used in the autoimmune-mediated CHB. Both the mother and the fetus might suffer from their side effects which can include growth problems and adrenal insufficiency.

=== Beta-adrenergic agonist ===
Trebutaline and Sulbutamol are among the medications that have been used to treat CHB. They are used mainly to increase the heart rate in fetuses suffering from bradycardia. Although they showed positive results, some patients showed intolerance to their side effects.

=== Plasmapheresis ===
Plasma exchange in women positive to anti Ro/La autoantibodies has not been studied thoroughly, but it is suggested to have and effect on the titer of the antibodies in the mother's serum and therefore might have a preventive role.

=== Intravenous immunoglobulin ===
Using intravenous immunoglobulin showed some promising results in decreasing the possibility of having CHB's complications such as EFE and cardiomyopathy.

=== Hydroxychloroquine ===
Hydroxychloroquine is relatively new approach, but it showed promising results in preventing the inflammation and other injuries result from it such as fibrosis.

Apart from these medications, a pace maker might be needed in around two thirds of the cases, and a procedure might be required when the heart has structural abnormalities.

== Outcomes ==
The outcome of the congenital heart block varies a lot due to several factors, such as the associated diseases, severity of the atrioventricular block, maternal age...etc.

In terms of the severity of the AV block, newborn kids with heart rate lower than 55 bpm have a negative outcome and higher chance to need pace-maker implantation, as well as kids with symptomatic bradycardia such as lower tolerance of exercises.

Isolated CHB has a better prognosis than the one associated with other disorders, the presence of congenital cardiac abnormalities increases the mortality rate. Also, kids presented with hydrops fetalis and / or EFE and / or cardiomyopathy have poor outcome.

Some studies showed a genetic contribution to the autoimmune CHB.

Among anti Ro/La positive women, older ones have higher possibility of having kids with heart block.

Mortality rate in CHB increases with earlier deliveries.

Kids with congenital heart block have higher chance to face health-related problems (such as infections) than other kids.

== Epidemiology ==
The congenital heart block occurs in 1 child in every 15,000 to 20,000 births.

More than 90% of the cases are associated with autoimmune disease and transference of maternal autoantibodies.

Without considering the gender, the age of diagnosis or the associated diseases, mortality rate is around 20%. The majority of CHB-related deaths occur in the first 3 months after birth followed by fetal death, and it is less common to occur after the third month of age.

Mortality rate is very high when the disease is diagnosed prenatally, and declines dramatically with older diagnosis ages.

Around 60% - 70% of the patients will need pace-maker implantation regardless of the age of diagnosis.

The disease seems to affect both males and females equally.

The survival rate is heavily affected by the associated diseases, and it is higher in autoimmune-mediated CHB patients compared to CHB patients with congenital cardiac structural problems.

Recurrence rate: mothers who had pregnancies associated with CHB, have a 16 - 18% chance of having kids with heart block in the following pregnancy.

A study in the United States showed that the vast majority of the affected mothers are of a Caucasian ethnicity, despite the fact that Systemic Lupus Erythematosus (SLE) is more common among minorities.

Table. I: The recurrence rate for pregnancies following the CHB-affected births
Outcome	Percentage of Pregnancies
Healthy	73%
CHB	16%
Fetal Demise	2%
Neonatal Death	2%
