= Auricular hypertrichosis =

- Specialty: Otology

Auricular hypertrichosis (hypertrichosis lanuginosa acquisita, hypertrichosis pinnae auris), also known as hairy pinna, is a genetic condition expressed as long and strong hairs growing from the helix of the pinna.

== Presentation ==
Ear hair generally refers to the terminal hair arising from follicles inside the external auditory meatus in humans. In its broader sense, ear hair may also include the fine vellus hair covering much of the ear, particularly at the prominent parts of the anterior ear, or even the abnormal hair growth as seen in hypertrichosis and hirsutism. Medical research on the function of ear hair is currently very scarce.

Hair growth within the ear canal is often observed to increase in older men, together with increased growth of nose hair. Excessive hair growth within or on the ear is known medically as auricular hypertrichosis. Some men, particularly in the male population of India, have coarse hair growth along the lower portion of the helix, a condition referred to as "having hairy pinnae" (hypertrichosis lanuginosa acquisita).

== Genetics ==
The genetic basis of auricular hypertrichosis has not been settled. Some researchers have proposed a Y-linked pattern of inheritance and others have suggested an autosomal gene is responsible. A third hypothesis predicts the phenotype results from the interaction of two loci, one on the homologous part of the X and Y and one on the nonhomologous sequence of the Y. These hypotheses are not mutually exclusive, and there may be a variety of genetic mechanisms underlying this phenotype.

Lee et al. (2004), using Y-chromosomal DNA binary-marker haplotyping, suggested that a cohort of southern Indian hairy-eared males carried Y chromosomes from many haplogroup. The hypothesis of Y- linkage would require multiple independent mutations within a single population. No significant difference between the Y-haplogroup frequencies of hairy-eared males and those of a geographically matched control sample of unaffected males was established. The study concluded that auricular hypertrichosis is not Y-linked in southern India, though this result may not apply to all to all populations.

== See also ==
- Ear hair
- Hypertrichosis
