= Sonoda syndrome =

- Other names: Round face with depressed nasal bridge and small mouth, congenital heart defect, and retarded development
- Specialty: Medical genetics

Sonoda syndrome is a rare genetic disorder characterized by cranio-facial dysmorphisms, fingerprint abnormalities, intellectual disability, and congenital cardiopathy. It has been described in a Japanese family.

== History ==
This condition has only been described once in history in three siblings from Japan (1987).

This trio of siblings was born in Miyazaki Prefecture, Japan to healthy, non-consanguineous Japanese parents who were in their mid-20s (25 years old, to be exact). The parents' height (the father was 170 cm tall and the mother was 153 cm tall), skin color (light), and craniofacial appearance were normal and average for their Japanese background, the mother did not have any history of miscarriage or stillbirth. While the both of them denied parental consanguinity, both of their familial lineages had lived in the same small isolated village for various years.

The proband was a 6-year-old toddler girl, she was born weighing 2664 grams. Measurements taken in March 1983 (nearly 2 years after her birth) showed a height of 73.1 cm, a weight of 7.1 kg, and a head circumference of 46 cm. Physical examination done in '87 detailed her dark skin tone and light brown hair (which the authors described as uncommon among the Japanese), a round face, flat nasal bridge, small nose, nostril anteversion, and the presence of whorls and loops in her fingerprints (3 and 7, respectively). Routine laboratory tests and a 550-band level karyotype gave normal results. She was noted to have a heart murmur which was then discovered to be caused by a ventricular septal defect (a type of congenital heart defect), but it disappeared on its own few years after the physical examination that discovered said defect (thought to be caused by a spontaneous closure of said defect).

The second case was her younger, 4-year-old toddler brother. He was born weighing 3042 grams, and was noted to have cyanosis at birth, which was an indicator for a possible heart anomaly. He learned how to control his head at 3 months of age and learned how to walk when he was 20 months old, at the age of 2 he was found to have a speech delay and could only say a handful of words. Physical examination done on him in July 1984 showed a height of 72.7 cm, a weight of 7.7 kg, and a head circumference of 44.5 cm. He had the same skin tone, hair color, and facial characteristics as his proband sister. A systolic ejection murmur (grade 4/6) could be heard at his second left intercostal face, this same murmur was later discovered to be caused by pulmonary valve stenosis. Like his sister, he also had whorls and loops in his fingerprints (4 and 6, respectively), and he had routine laboratory tests and a karyotype which turned back normal. Physical examination done in him again in May 1987 showed a height of 94.3 cm, a weight of 45.2 kg, and a head circumference of 49.7 cm. His bone age was appropriate for his age.

The third and final case was the youngest brother of the three, a 2-year old infant boy. He weighed 2962 grams at birth and he was found to have heart murmur when he was 3 months old. Physical examination done on him in May 1986 showed a height of 63 cm, a weight of 5.3 kg, and a head circumference of 41.5 cm. His skin color, hair color and facial features were the same as his siblings'. His heart murmur was found to be a grade 3/6 systolic murmur that could be heard in his lower left sternal border, after cardiac echography and other tests, the murmur was ruled out to be benign and harmless. He was noted to have ankyloglossia and hypospadias. He was also found to have whorls and loops in his fingerprints just like his siblings (5 and 5, respectively). A karyotype done on him gave back normal results. Physical examination done on him a year later in May 1987 showed a height of 73.9 cm, a weight of 8.8 kg, and a head circumference of 47.4 cm. He could control his head at the age of 6 months but even at the age of 18 months he was found to have a walking delay and a speech delay. Routine laboratory tests and bone age examination turned back normal.

The authors of the condition concluded that this combination of symptoms was probably inherited in an autosomal recessive manner.
