= X-linked hypertrichosis =

Chromosomal disorder

- Other names: X-linked congenital generalized hypertrichosis
- X-linked hypertrichosis is an X-linked dominant disorder.
- Specialty: Dermatology

X-linked hypertrichosis, also known as X-linked congenital generalized hypertrichosis, is a hereditary disorder characterized by generalized congenital hypertrichosis and thick eyebrows.

== Signs and symptoms ==
Hypertrichosis is characterized as excessive hair growth anywhere on the body, in either men or women. X-linked hypertrichosis affects males more than females.

== Causes ==
X-linked hypertrichosis was found in a Mexican family to be caused by a 389 kb interchromosomal insertion at an extragenic palindrome site at Xq27.1. The inserted DNA significantly reduces the expression of fibroblast growth factor 13.

X-linked hypertrichosis is inherited in an X-linked dominant pattern of inheritance.

== See also ==
- Generalized hyperhidrosis
- List of cutaneous conditions
