= Hagemoser–Weinstein–Bresnick syndrome =

- Hagemoser–Weinstein–Bresnick syndrome is inherited in an autosomal dominant manner
- Specialty: Ophthalmology, otorhinolaryngology

Hagemoser–Weinstein–Bresnick syndrome is an autosomal dominant genetic disorder first described by Hagemoser et al. in 1989. It is characterized by optic atrophy followed shortly by loss of hearing and peripheral neuropathy. Onset of the disease occurred in early childhood, as opposed to the later onset of similar diseases. Optic atrophy occurs in the first year and the following symptoms show up before thirteen years. A possible autosomal recessive form of this disease was described in 1970 by Iwashita et al.

== See also ==
- Leber's hereditary optic neuropathy
- Charcot–Marie–Tooth disease
