= Hereditary sensory and autonomic neuropathy type I =

- Specialty: Neurology

Hereditary sensory and autonomic neuropathy type I (HSAN I) or hereditary sensory neuropathy type I (HSN I) is a group of autosomal dominant inherited neurological diseases that affect the peripheral nervous system particularly on the sensory and autonomic functions. The hallmark of the disease is the marked loss of pain and temperature sensation in the distal parts of the lower limbs. The autonomic disturbances, if present, manifest as sweating abnormalities.

The beginning of the disease varies between adolescence and adulthood. Since affected individuals cannot feel pain, minor wounds or blisters in the painless area may not be immediately recognized and can develop into extensive and deep foot ulcerations. Once infection occurs, the complications such as inflammation and progressive destruction of the underlying bones may follow and may require amputation of the surrounding area.

HSAN I is the most common type among the five types of HSAN. As a heterogeneous group of diseases, HSAN I can be divided into five subtypes HSAN IA-E. Most of the genes associated with the diseases have been identified. However, the molecular pathways leading to the manifestation of the diseases are not fully understood. Therefore, the potential targets for therapeutic interventions are not known. Moreover, gene-based therapies for patients with the diseases are not available to date, hence supportive care is the only treatment available for the patients.

== Signs and symptoms ==
At the beginning, affected individuals often notice the loss of pain and temperature sensation or all sensory modalities in their feet. As the disease progresses, the sensory abnormalities may extend up to the knees. However, they often do not notice sensory loss for a long time. Many affected individuals only become aware of the disease when they notice painless injuries and burns or when they seek medical advice for slowly healing wounds or foot ulcers. Foot ulcerations may appear due to permanent pressure, such as long walks or badly fitting shoes. Minor wounds or blisters may then lead to deep foot ulcerations. Once infection occurs, complications such as inflammation and destruction of the underlying bones may follow. Affected individuals who do not lose sensation may experience spontaneous pain. In addition, many affected individuals exhibit, to a variable degree, symmetrical distal muscle weakness and wasting.

HSAN I is characterized by marked sensory disturbances mainly as the loss of pain and temperature sensation in the distal parts of the lower limbs. The loss of sensation can also extend to the proximal parts of the lower limbs and the upper limbs as the disease progresses. Some affected individuals do not lose sensation, but instead experience severe shooting, burning, and lancinating pains in the limbs or in the trunk. Autonomic disturbances, if present, manifest as decreased sweating. The degree of motor disturbances is highly variable, even within families, ranging from absent to severe distal muscle weakness and wasting.

The disease progresses slowly, but often disables the affected individuals severely after a long duration. The onset of the disease varies between the 2nd and 5th decade of life, albeit congenital or childhood onset has occasionally been reported. With the progression of the disease, the affected individuals lose the ability to feel pain in their feet and legs. Minor injuries in the painless area can result in slow-healing wounds which, if not immediately recognized, can develop into chronic ulcerations. Once infection occurs, these ulcerations can result in severe complications that lead to foot deformity, such as inflammation of the underlying bones, spontaneous bone fractures, and progressive degeneration of weight-bearing joints. Furthermore, foot deformity promotes skin changes such as hyperkeratosis at pressure points. These complications may necessitate amputation of the affected foot.

Biopsies of severely affected sural nerve (short saphenous nerve) in patients with HSAN I showed evidence of neuronal degeneration. Only a very few myelinated fibers were observed some of which showed a sign of primary (segmental) demyelination. A reasonable number of unmyelinated axons remained, although the presence of stacks of flattened Schwann cell processes suggested unmyelinated axon loss. Electrophysiological testing provides additional evidence that neuronal degeneration underlies the disease. Sensory potentials are usually absent in the lower limbs but are often recordable or even normal in the upper limbs of the patients. In addition, motor conduction is slow, possibly implying a demyelinating process.

== Cause ==
Advances in molecular genetics have enabled identification of most genes associated with HSAN I. However, the molecular mechanisms that underlie the disease are not fully understood and are under investigation. One of challenges in the investigation is to elucidate how faulty genes that are ubiquitously expressed and are involved in basic cellular functions, such as sphingolipid metabolism, maintenance of organellar integrity, membrane dynamics, and transcription regulation, affect specific populations of neurons.

=== HSAN IA ===
HSAN IA is associated with heterozygous missense mutations in the SPTLC1 gene. The gene encodes SPTLC1 protein, which together with SPTLC2 protein, forms serine palmitoyltransferase (SPT) in humans. SPT is a pyridoxal-5'-phosphate-dependent enzyme that catalyzes the first and rate-limiting step in the de novo biosynthesis of sphingolipids. Together with cholesterol, sphingolipids form the main component of lipid rafts, structures in the plasma membrane that facilitate efficient signal transduction. Many intermediate sphingoid bases and their derivatives, as well as complex sphingolipids, are active as extracellular and intracellular regulators of growth, differentiation, migration, survival, and cellular responses to stress.

Initially, mutations in the SPTLC1 gene were associated with increased activity of SPT. Subsequent studies rather suggested that the mutations reduce the activity of the enzyme. However, it cannot account for the aberrant sphingolipid-related cellular features in heterozygous patient-derived cells or the HSAN IA clinical features in heterozygous mice. These results suggest that the activity of non-mutant SPTLC1 protein may be sufficient for maintaining normal sphingolipid biosynthesis and cell viability. Therefore, the neuronal degeneration in HSAN IA is likely due to subtler and rather long-term effects of the mutations or perhaps accumulation of toxic lipids produced by mutant enzymes.

Further studies supported the latter notion. The mutations have been shown in vitro to facilitate substrate promiscuity of SPT. Mutant SPT mediates the condensation not only of its normal substrate serine, but also of alanine or glycine, with palmitoyl-coenzyme A. The reactions lead to the formation of two aberrant sphingolipid metabolites 1-deoxy-sphinganine and 1-deoxymethyl-sphinganine, respectively. As the metabolites lack a hydroxyl group that is required for their further conversion and degradation, they accumulate inside the cell. The metabolites have been shown to be more toxic to sensory neurons than to motor neurons. They accumulate in the peripheral nervous system where HSAN manifest, but not in the central nervous system in mice bearing a HSAN IA-associated mutation. Furthermore, serine-enriched diet reduced the levels of the metabolites and improved sensory and motor performance of the mice. A small-scale clinical trial also showed similar results. These studies demonstrated that an altered substrate selectivity of the mutant SPT is the key to the pathophysiology of HSAN IA.

=== HSAN IB ===
HSAN IB is linked to a 3.42 cM interval on chromosome 3p22–p24. This finding was confirmed in another family with similar clinical features. However, mutation analysis of genes in the candidate region has not revealed any disease-causing gene. Since then, this rare form of HSAN I has not been reported in other families. The gene associated with the disease still remains to be identified.

=== HSAN IC ===
HSAN IC is associated with heterozygous missense mutations in the SPTLC2 gene. The gene encodes SPTLC2 protein which is one of two subunits of SPT. As mutations in the gene affect the same enzyme as those in the SPTLC1 gene, the molecular basis of the disease is suggested to be the same as that of HSAN IA.

=== HSAN ID ===
HSAN ID is caused by heterozygous missense mutations in the ATL1 gene which encodes atlastin-1. Atlastin-1 is a member of the dynamin/Mx/guanylate-binding protein superfamily of large GTPases. The enzyme contains an endoplasmic reticulum (ER) retention moiety, indicating that it functions predominantly in the organelle. It is highly expressed in the mammalian central nervous system and is enriched in the hippocampus and pyramidal neurons. However, information on the expression of the gene in the peripheral nervous system is still lacking.

In fruit fly (Drosophila melanogaster), atlastin-1 has been shown to induce tethering and fusion of membranes adjacent to the ER to help maintain the integrity of the ER. The function of atlastin-1 is crucially dependent on its GTPase activity. In humans, a HSAN ID-associated mutation caused significant loss of the GTPase activity of the enzyme, leading to prominent disruption of ER network. In addition to maintaining the integrity of the ER, atlastin-1 also has neuron-related functions. The enzyme is implicated in the trafficking and signaling of type I bone morphogenetic protein (BMP) receptors in zebra fish (Danio rerio). BMP signaling is involved in axon guidance and synapse formation, as well as axonal transport and the organization of the microtubule network in developing neurons. The signaling is disturbed in several neurodegenerative disorders. It also regulates membrane dynamics in the neuronal growth cone in rat.

Mutations in the ATL1 gene are also a common cause of early-onset hereditary spastic paraplegia (HSP) in humans. The disease is characterized by progressive stiffness and contraction (spasticity) in the lower limbs due to damage to or dysfunction of the nerves. The vast majority of HSP-associated mutations are missense mutations that are scattered throughout the affected protein. Some of these mutations have been shown to reduce the GTPase activity of atlastin-1 in vitro. However, the unique molecular signature of the mutations or the functional domains of the ATL1 gene that are affected in patients with HSAN ID and HSP that could explain the differences in clinical features between these two diseases are not clear. This finding indicates that additional genetic and/or environmental factors may modulate the clinical manifestation of the main causative mutation.

=== HSAN IE ===
HSAN IE is associated with heterozygous missense mutations in the DNMT1 gene which encodes DNA methyltransferase 1 (Dnmt1). Dnmt1 belongs to a family of enzymes that catalyze the transfer of a methyl group from S-adenosyl methionine to DNA. Dnmt1 has a high preference for hemimethylated DNA, hence it is called maintenance methyltransferase. The protein also has de novo DNA methyltransferase activity which is responsible for establishing methylation patterns during embryonic development. Dnmt1 is highly expressed in post-mitotic neurons in the adult central nervous system, with peak expression during the S-phase of the cell cycle.

The mutations are located in the DNA-sequence-targeting domain of Dnmt1 which is responsible for chromatin binding during the late S-phase and for sustaining the association of Dnmt1 with DNA during the G2 and M-phases of the cell cycle. Mutant Dnmt1 is misfolded and unable to bind to heterochromatin after the S-phase. Therefore, the mutant proteins are quickly targeted for degradation. In patients with the mutations, global hypomethylation and local hypermethylation are observed in their genomic DNA. These observations establish a formal causal link between DNA methylation defects and a disease of the peripheral nervous system.

== Diagnosis ==
The diagnosis of HSAN I is based on the observation of symptoms described above and is supported by a family history suggesting autosomal dominant inheritance. The diagnosis is also supported by additional tests, such as nerve conduction studies in the lower limbs to confirm a sensory and motor neuropathy. In sporadic cases, acquired neuropathies, such as the diabetic foot syndrome and alcoholic neuropathy, can be excluded by the use of magnetic resonance imaging and by interdisciplinary discussion between neurologists, dermatologists, and orthopedics.

The diagnosis of the disease has been revolutionized by the identification of the causative genes. The diagnosis is now based on the detection of the mutations by direct sequencing of the genes. Nevertheless, the accurate phenotyping of patients remains crucial in the diagnosis. For pregnant patients, termination of pregnancy is not recommended.

HSAN I must be distinguished from hereditary motor and sensory neuropathy (HMSN) and other types of hereditary sensory and autonomic neuropathies (HSAN II-V). The prominent sensory abnormalities and foot ulcerations are the only signs to separate HSAN I from HMSN. HSAN II can be differentiated from HSAN I as it is inherited as an autosomal recessive trait, it has earlier disease onset, the sensory loss is diffused to the whole body, and it has less or no motor symptoms. HSAN III-V can be easily distinguished from HSAN I because of congenital disease onset. Moreover, these types exhibit typical features, such as the predominant autonomic disturbances in HSAN III or congenital loss of pain and anhidrosis in HSAN IV.

=== Subtypes ===
In 1993, Peter James Dyck divided HSAN I further into five subtypes HSAN IA-E based on the presence of additional features. These features were thought to result from the genetic diversity of HSAN I (i.e. the expression of different genes, different alleles of a single gene, or modifying genes) or environmental factors. Molecular genetic studies later confirmed the genetic diversity of the disease.

Subtype	Gene or locus	Mutation (DNA/Amino acid)^{*}	Clinical features	Age of onset	OMIM^{*}
IA	SPTLC1	399T>G/C133W; 398G>A/C133Y; 431T>A/V144D	Predominant loss of pain and temperature sensation; sometimes initial sign with long preservation of vibration sense; burning and lancinating pains; ulcerative mutilations; variable distal motor involvement	Adolescence^{*}	162400
IB	3p24-p22	unknown	Predominant sensory neuropathy with cough and gastroesophageal reflux; foot ulcerations (rare)	Adulthood	608088
IC	SPTLC2	1075G>A/V359M; 1145G>T/G382V; 1510A>T/I504F	Loss of pain and temperature sensation; lancinating pain; ulcerative mutilations; variable distal motor involvement; acro-mutilating complications	Adulthood^{*}	613640
ID	ALT1	196G>C/E66Q; 976delG/[V326WfsX8]^{*}	Severe distal sensory loss and amyotrophy in lower limbs; trophic skin and nail changes; ulcerative mutilations	Adulthood	613708
IE	DNMT1	1484A>G/Y495C; 1470-1472TCC>ATA/D490E-P491Y^{*}	Loss of all somatosensory modalities; lancinating pain; ulcerative mutilations; sensorineuronal hearing loss, dementia	Adulthood	614116

^DNA; A: adenine, T: thymine, G: guanine, C: cytosine. Amino acid; C: cysteine, W: tryptophan, Y: tyrosine, V: valine, D: aspartic acid, M: methionine, G: glycine, I: isoleucine, F: phenylalanine, E: glutamic acid, Q: glutamine, P: proline.
^The nucleotide deletion predicted to cause a large C-terminal protein truncation.
^A triple nucleotide change.
^Congenital onset in one patient with hypotonia, cataracts, microcephaly, and vocal cord paralysis.
^Childhood onset in one patient.
^OMIM: Online Mendelian Inheritance in Man.

== Management ==
Gene-based therapies for patients with HSAN I are not available to date, hence supportive care is the only treatment available for the patients. Ulcero-mutilating complications are the most serious, prominent, and leading diagnostic features in HSAN I. Since the complications mimic foot ulcers caused by diabetic neuropathy, the treatment for foot ulcers and infections can follow the guidelines given for diabetic foot care which starts with early and accurate counseling of patients about risk factors for developing foot ulcerations. Orthopedic care and the use of well fitting shoes without pressure points should also be included. Recently, the treatment of the foot complications has reached an efficient level allowing treatment on an outpatient basis. Early treatment of the foot complications often avoids hospitalization and, in particular, amputations. In sum, the principles of the treatment are removal of pressure to the ulcers, eradication of infection, and specific protective footwear afterwards.

=== Genetic counseling ===
Autosomal dominant mode of inheritance

Genetic counseling is an important tool for preventing new cases if this is wished by at-risk family members. Appropriate genetic counseling is based on an accurate diagnosis. Therefore, clinicians and genetic counselors should use ulcero-mutilating complications as the main diagnostic criteria. Since the disease is inherited as an autosomal dominant trait, there is a Mendelian risk of 50% for subsequent generations regardless of their sex. Prenatal testing for pregnancies at increased risk is possible if the disease-causing mutation has been identified in the family. Predictive testing is useful for young people to avoid serious complications of the disease.

== Prognosis ==
If patients with HSAN I receive appropriate treatment and counseling, the prognosis is good. Early treatment of foot infections may avoid serious complications. Nevertheless, the complications are manageable, thus allowing an acceptable quality of life. The disease progresses slowly and does not influence the life expectancy if signs and symptoms are properly treated.

== Epidemiology ==
HSAN I constitutes a clinically and genetically heterogeneous group of diseases of low prevalence. Detailed epidemiological data are currently not available. The frequency of the disease is still reflected by reports of a handful affected families. Although the impressive clinical features of HSAN I are seen by neurologists, general practitioners, orthopedists, and dermatologists, the condition might still be under-recognized particularly for sporadic cases and patients who do not exhibit the characteristic clinical features.

== History ==
The first description of sporadic and familial cases of a condition that is compatible with HSAN was made in French literature in the 19th century. The main feature of the familial case was ulcers at the sole of the feet. In 1922, Hicks described a similar condition in a London family in which 10 persons suffered from perforating ulcers on their feet, lancinating and shooting pains, and deafness. Subsequently, Jughenn et al. and Denny-Brown demonstrated that the pathological process underlying the clinical features seen in these conditions was a neuropathy, rather than an anatomical disorder as had been previously suggested. Since then, many other familial conditions with similar clinical features have been reported.

The early names of the inherited neuropathies were given after the most prominent features or the suggested underlying mechanism of the diseases, such as mal perforant du pied, ulcero-mutilating neuropathy, hereditary perforating ulcers, familial trophoneurosis, familial syringomyelia, hereditary sensory radicular neuropathy, among others. In dermatological literature, the term Thèvenard syndrome is still used for familial forms, whereas Bureau-Barrière syndrome is for sporadic forms.

In 1975, Dyck and Otha proposed a descriptive classification of the diseases and introduced the term hereditary sensory neuropathy (HSN) which later was changed to hereditary sensory and autonomic neuropathy (HSAN) given the substantial autonomic involvement in the diseases. The diseases were categorized into five types HSAN I-V based on the mode of inheritance, the predominant clinical features, and the age at onset. The diseases that are characterized by autosomal dominant mode of inheritance and adolescence or adulthood disease onset are categorized in HSAN I.

== See also ==
- Hereditary sensory and autonomic neuropathy
- Hereditary sensory and autonomic neuropathy type III (Familial dysautonomia)
- Hereditary sensory and autonomic neuropathy type IV (Congenital insensitivity to pain with anhidrosis)
- Hereditary motor and sensory neuropathy
- A Life Without Pain
