= Halal syndrome =

- Other names: Microcephaly-cleft palate syndrome

Halal syndrome is a rare disorder characterised by microcephaly, cleft palate, and variable other anomalies. The disease is named after Fahed Halal, one of its discoverers.
