= Histidinuria renal tubular defect syndrome =

Histidinuria-renal tubular defect syndrome
- Other names: Renal histidinuria, Histidinuria due to a renal tubular defect
- Specialty: Medical genetics
- Causes: Medical genetics

Histidinuria-renal tubular defect syndrome is a rare genetic disorder characterized by histidinuria associated with the intestines' and the renal tubule's impaired ability of absorbing histidine. Additional findings include intellectual disability, developmental delay, epilepsy, and mild congenital variations. Only five cases (all male) from four families have been described in medical literature.
