= Endocardial fibroelastosis =

Endocardial Fibroelastosis
- Other names: EFE
- Specialty: Cardiology

Endocardial fibroelastosis (EFE) is a rare heart disorder usually occurring in children two years old and younger. It may also be considered a reaction to stress, not necessarily a specific disease.

It should not be confused with endomyocardial fibrosis.

== Signs and symptoms ==
EFE is characterized by a thickening of the innermost lining of the heart chambers (the endocardium) due to an increase in the amount of supporting connective tissue and elastic fibres. It is an uncommon cause of unexplained heart failure in infants and children, and is one component of HEC syndrome. Fibroelastosis is strongly seen as a primary cause of restrictive cardiomyopathy in children, along with cardiac amyloidosis, which is more commonly seen in progressive multiple myeloma patients and the elderly.

== Cause ==
A review cites references to 31 different diseases and other stresses associated with the EFE reaction. These include infections, cardiomyopathies, immunologic diseases, congenital malformations, even electrocution by lightning strike. EFE has two distinct genetic forms, each having a different mode of inheritance. An X-linked recessive form, and an autosomal recessive form have both been observed.

== Diagnosis ==
A Cardiac MRI can show eccentric patchy thickening of endocardium which is a non-specific finding. Myocardial biopsy is a definitive test.

== Treatment ==
The cause should be identified and, where possible, the treatment should be directed to that cause. A last resort form of treatment is heart transplant.

== History ==
An infant with dilated, failing heart was no rarity on the pediatric wards of hospitals in the mid-twentieth century. On autopsy, most of these patients' hearts showed the thickened endocardial layer noted above. This was thought to be a disease affecting both the heart muscle and the endocardium and it was given various names such as: idiopathic hypertrophy of the heart, endocardial sclerosis, cardiac enlargement of unknown cause, etc. Some of these hearts also had overt congenital anomalies, especially aortic stenosis and coarctation of the aorta.

The term "endocardial fibroelastosis" was introduced by Weinberg and Himmelfarb in 1943. In their pathology laboratory they noted that usually the endocardium was pearly white or opaque instead of normally thin and transparent and microscopically showed a systematic layering of collagenous and elastic fibers. They felt their new term was more adequately descriptive, and, indeed it was quickly and widely adopted. Clinicians began applying it to any infant with a dilated, failing heart, in spite of the fact that the only way to definitively establish the presence of EFE was to see it at autopsy. EFE had quickly become the name of a disease, and it continues to be used by many physicians in this way, though many patients with identical symptoms do not have the endocardial reaction of EFE.

In the latter decades of the twentieth century, new discoveries and new thinking about heart muscle disease gave rise to the term "cardiomyopathy". Many of the cases of infantile cardiac failure were accordingly called "primary cardiomyopathy" as well as "primary EFE", while those with identifiable congenital anomalies stressing the heart were called "secondary EFE". In 1957 Black-Schaffer proposed a unitary explanation that stress on the ventricle, of any kind, may trigger the endocardial reaction, so that all EFE could be thought of as secondary.

Evidence gradually accumulated as to the role of infection as one such type of stress. The studies of Fruhling and colleagues in 1962 were critical. They followed a series of epidemics of Coxsackie virus infection in their part of France. After each epidemic there were increased numbers of cases with EFE coming to autopsy. On closer study there were cases of pure acute myocarditis, cases of mixed myocarditis and EFE, and cases where myocarditis had healed, leaving just EFE. They were able to culture Coxsackie virus from the tissues of many of the cases at all stages of this apparent progression. A similar progression from myocarditis to EFE was later observed at Johns Hopkins but no virology was done.

Noren and colleagues at the University of Minnesota, acting on an idea floated at a pediatric meeting, were able to show a relation between exposure to maternal mumps in fetal life, EFE, and a positive skin test for mumps in infants. This brought on a large ongoing controversy and finally prompted a virologist colleague of theirs to inject embryonated eggs with mumps virus. The chicks at first showed the changes of myocarditis, about a year later, typical EFE, and transitional changes in between. Despite this, the controversy about the role of mumps continued as the actual incidence of EFE plummeted. The proponents of mumps as a cause pointed to this as the effect of the recent implementation of widespread mumps immunization.

Evidence that viral infection may play a role as a cause or trigger of EFE was greatly reinforced by the study directed by Towbin in the virus laboratory of Texas Children's Hospital. They applied the methods of today's genetics to old preserved specimens from autopsies of patients with EFE done well before mumps immunization began and found mumps genome in the tissues of over 80% of these patients. It seems undeniable that transplacental mumps infection had been in the past the major cause of EFE, and that immunization was indeed the cause of EFE having become rare.

Non-infectious causes of EFE have also been studied, spurred by the opening of new avenues of genetics research. Now there are specific named genes associated with certain cardiomyopathies, some of which show the characteristic reaction of EFE. A typical example is Barth syndrome and the responsible gene, tafazzin.

Developments in echocardiography, both the technology of the machines and the skill of the operators, have made it no longer necessary to see the endocardium at autopsy. EFE can now be found non-invasively by the recording of increased endocardial echos. Fetal echocardiography has shown that EFE can begin to accumulate as early as 14 weeks of gestation, and increase with incredible rapidity and even that it can be reversed if the stress can be removed early in fetal life.

The North American Pediatric Cardiomyopathy Registry was founded in 2000 and has been supported since by the National Heart, Lung and Blood Institute. Because of the logic of the diagnostic tree, where EFE applies to many branches of the tree and thus cannot occupy a branch, it is not listed by the Registry as a cause but rather, "with EFE" is a modifier that can be applied to any cause.

Thus, the past half-century has seen EFE evolve from a mysterious but frequently observed disease to a rare but much better understood reaction to many diseases and other stresses.

== See also ==
- Papillary fibroelastoma
