= HEC syndrome =

- Other names: Hydrocephalus-endocardial fibroelastosis-cataract syndrome

HEC syndrome is a syndrome characterized by hydrocephalus, endocardial fibroelastosis and cataracts.
