= Hamanishi Ueba Tsuji syndrome =

- Other names: congenital aplasia of the extensor muscles of the fingers and thumb associated with generalized polyneuropathy, polyneuropathy hand defect
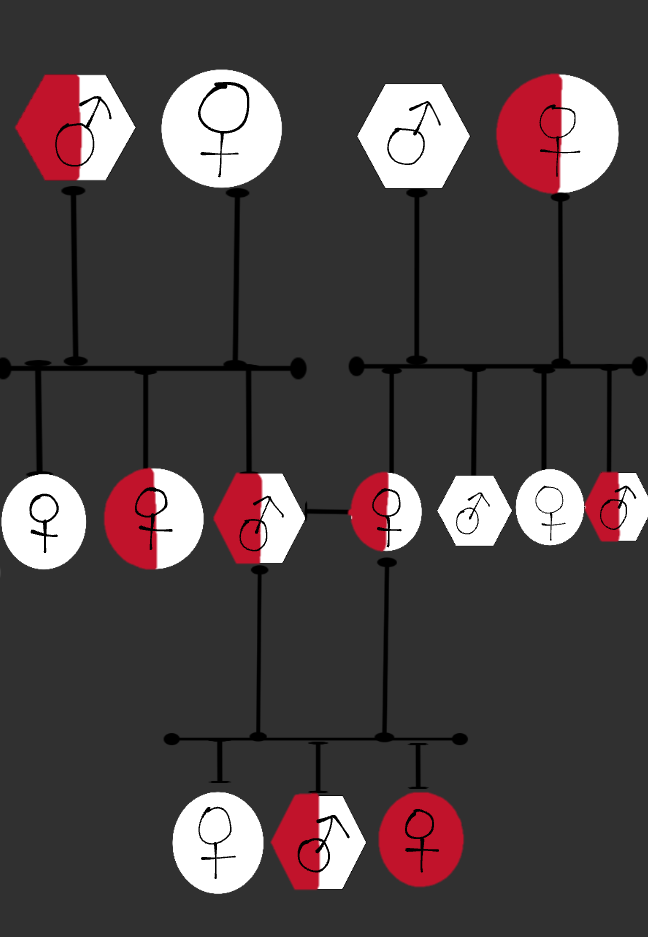
- This syndrome is inherited in an autosomal recessive fashion
- Specialty: Medical genetics
- Symptoms: muscle, nerve, and skeletal problems,
- Usual onset: birth
- Duration: life-long
- Causes: Genetic mutation
- Risk factors: having parents with the disease

Hamanishi Ueba Tsuji syndrome is a rare genetic motor and sensorial neuropathy which is characterized by digital (thumb and fingers) flexion malformations, reduced touch and pain sensations of the limbs, hypohidrosis, muscular dystrophy, minor physical anomalies (such as camptodactyly), and skeletal muscle atrophy. This disorder is inherited in an autosomal recessive fashion, and its exact prevalence is unknown, although it is believed to be around 1 in 100,000. No new cases of this syndrome have been reported since 1986.
