= Hand and foot deformity with flat facies =

- Other names: Emery-Nelson syndrome; Familial syndrome of short stature, deformities of the hands and feet, and unusual facies
- Frequency: 0.0001%

Hand and foot deformity with flat facies is a rare congenital malformation syndrome, where an individual has features such as facial dysmorphism, short stature, and other malformations with the limbs.

Individuals with the condition can also have intellectual disability, flat face, coarse hair, or camptodactyly.

This disorder is present at birth but isn't diagnosed until middle childhood.

The syndrome was first described by Alan E. H. Emery and Matilda M. Nelson of the University of Edinburgh in 1970. There have been no further reports in the literature since 1970.
