= DAX1 =

Protein-coding gene in humans

NR0B1
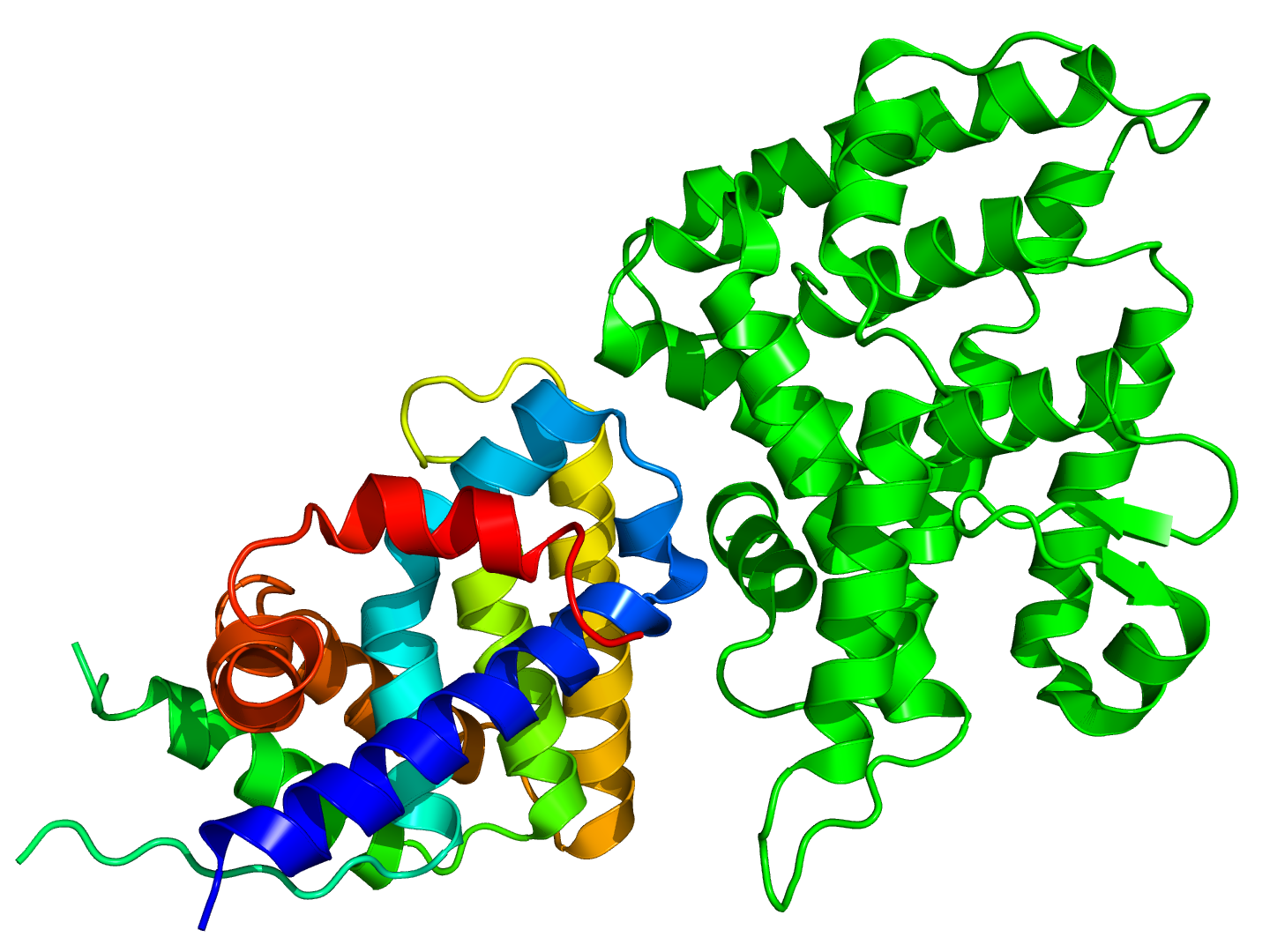

Identifiers
- Aliases: NR0B1, AHC, AHCH, AHX, DAX-1, DAX1, DSS, GTD, HHG, NROB1, SRXY2, nuclear receptor subfamily 0 group B member 1, Dax1
- External IDs: OMIM: 300473; MGI: 1352460; GeneCards: NR0B1
Available structures
PDB	Ortholog search: PDBe RCSB
PDB	List of PDB id codes 4RWV

Gene location (Human)
Chr.	X chromosome (human)
Band	Xp21.2	Start	30,304,206 bp
Band	Xp21.2	End	30,309,390 bp

Gene location (Mouse)
Chr.	X chromosome (mouse)
Band	X C1|X 39.67 cM	Start	85,235,370 bp
Band	X C1|X 39.67 cM	End	85,239,553 bp
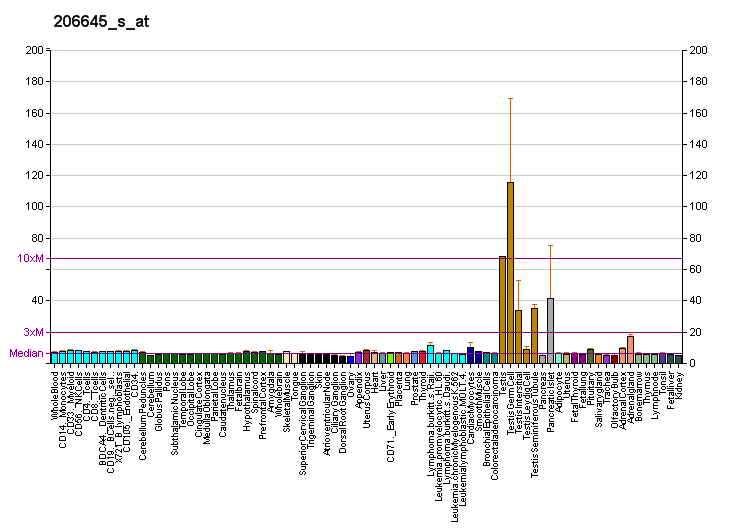

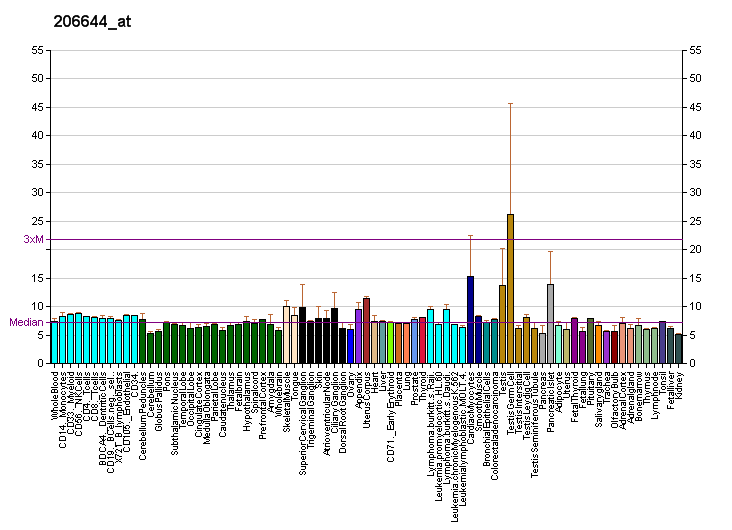
RNA expression pattern
Bgee	Human / Mouse (ortholog); Top expressed in: right adrenal gland; left adrenal gland; right adrenal cortex; left adrenal cortex; gonad; testicle; right testis; left testis; islet of Langerhans; germinal epithelium / Top expressed in: embryo; seminiferous tubule; adrenal cortex; embryo; ovary; spermatocyte; blastocyst; ventromedial nucleus; Gonadal ridge; epiblast; More reference expression data
BioGPS	More reference expression data
Gene ontology
Molecular function	protein domain specific binding; sequence-specific DNA binding; protein homodimerization activity; RNA binding; nuclear receptor activity; AF-2 domain binding; DNA binding; DNA hairpin binding; steroid hormone receptor activity; protein binding; transcription corepressor activity; transcription factor binding; DNA-binding transcription factor activity, RNA polymerase II-specific
Cellular component	cytoplasm; nucleus; membrane; polysomal ribosome; nucleoplasm; microtubule organizing center; nuclear speck; intracellular membrane-bounded organelle
Biological process	sex-determination system; spermatogenesis; negative regulation of DNA-binding transcription factor activity; transcription, DNA-templated; response to immobilization stress; pituitary gland development; gonad development; Leydig cell differentiation; steroid hormone mediated signaling pathway; transcription initiation from RNA polymerase II promoter; protein localization; hypothalamus development; negative regulation of cell differentiation; male sex determination; Sertoli cell differentiation; negative regulation of intracellular steroid hormone receptor signaling pathway; regulation of transcription, DNA-templated; cell differentiation; steroid biosynthetic process; male gonad development; adrenal gland development; negative regulation of transcription, DNA-templated; intracellular receptor signaling pathway; negative regulation of transcription by RNA polymerase II
Sources:Amigo / QuickGO
Orthologs
Databases	NCBI: entry; OMA: entry
Species	Human	Mouse
Entrez	190	11614
Ensembl	ENSG00000169297	ENSMUSG00000025056
UniProt	P51843	Q61066
RefSeq (mRNA)	NM_000475	NM_007430
RefSeq (protein)	NP_000466; NP_000466.2	NP_031456
Location (UCSC)	Chr X: 30.3 – 30.31 Mb	Chr X: 85.24 – 85.24 Mb
PubMed search
- Wikidata
View/Edit Human	View/Edit Mouse

DAX1 (dosage-sensitive sex reversal, adrenal hypoplasia critical region, on chromosome X, gene 1) is a nuclear receptor protein that in humans is encoded by the NR0B1 gene (nuclear receptor subfamily 0, group B, member 1). The NR0B1 gene is located on the short (p) arm of the X chromosome between bands Xp21.3 and Xp21.2, from base pair 30,082,120 to base pair 30,087,136.

== Function ==
This gene encodes a protein that lacks the normal DNA-binding domain contained in other nuclear receptors. The encoded protein acts as a dominant-negative regulator of transcription of other nuclear receptors including steroidogenic factor 1. This protein also functions as an anti-testis gene by acting antagonistically to SRY. Mutations in this gene result in both X-linked congenital adrenal hypoplasia and hypogonadotropic hypogonadism.

DAX1 plays an important role in the normal development of several hormone-producing tissues. These tissues include the adrenal glands above each kidney, the pituitary gland and hypothalamus, which are located in the brain, and the reproductive structures (the testes and ovaries). DAX1 controls the activity of certain genes in the cells that form these tissues during embryonic development. Proteins that control the activity of other genes are known as transcription factors. DAX1 also plays a role in regulating hormone production in these tissues after they have been formed.

== Role in disease ==
X-linked adrenal hypoplasia congenita is caused by mutations in the NR0B1 gene. More than 90 NR0B1 mutations that cause X-linked adrenal hypoplasia congenita have been identified. Many of these mutations delete all or part of the NR0B1 gene, preventing the production of DAX1 protein. Some mutations cause the production of an abnormally short protein. Other mutations cause a change in one of the building blocks (amino acids) of DAX1. These mutations are thought to result in a misshapen, nonfunctional protein. Loss of DAX1 function leads to adrenal insufficiency and hypogonadotropic hypogonadism, which are the main characteristics of this disorder.

Duplication of genetic material on the X chromosome in the region that contains the NR0B1 gene can cause a condition called dosage-sensitive sex reversal. The extra copy of the NR0B1 gene prevents the formation of male reproductive tissues. People who have this duplication usually have female external genitalia, despite having the typical male XY chromosomes.

In some cases, genetic material is deleted from the X chromosome in a region that contains several genes, including NR0B1. This deletion results in a condition called adrenal hypoplasia congenita with complex glycerol kinase deficiency. In addition to the signs and symptoms of adrenal hypoplasia congenita, individuals with this condition may have elevated levels of lipids in their blood and urine and may have problems regulating blood sugar levels. In rare cases, the amount of genetic material deleted is even more extensive and affected individuals also have Duchenne muscular dystrophy.

== Interactions ==
DAX1 has been shown to interact with:

- COPS2,
- NRIP1,
- Steroidogenic factor 1, and
- SREBF1.
