= Hypertryptophanemia =

- Other names: Familial hypertryptophanemia
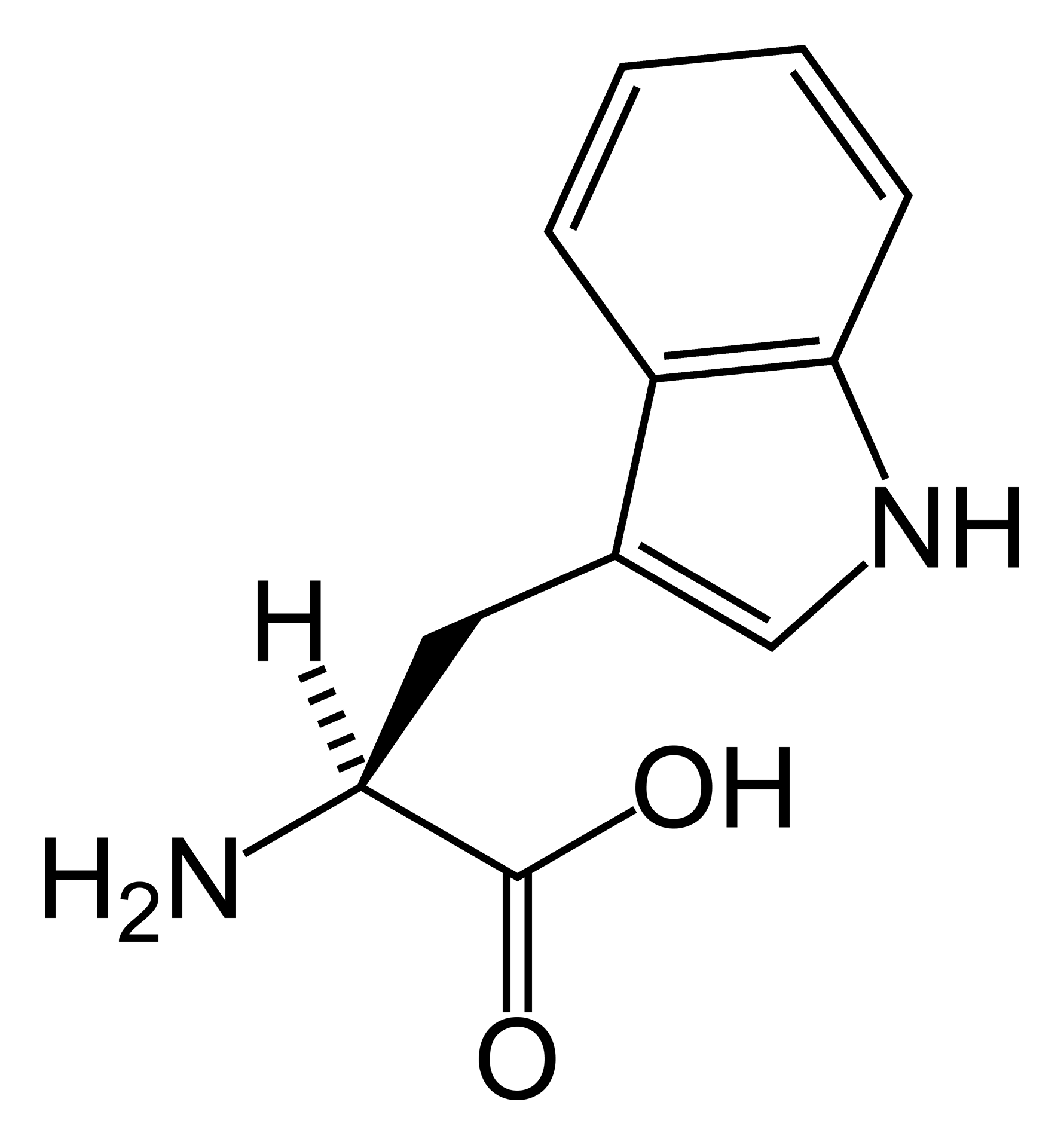
- Tryptophan
- Specialty: Endocrinology

Hypertryptophanemia is a rare autosomal recessive metabolic disorder that results in a massive buildup of the amino acid tryptophan in the blood, with associated symptoms and tryptophanuria (-uria denotes 'in the urine').

Elevated levels of tryptophan are also seen in Hartnup disease, a disorder of amino acid transport. However, the increase of tryptophan in that disorder is negligible when compared to that of hypertryptophanemia.

== Symptoms and signs ==
A number of abnormalities and symptoms have been observed with hypertryptophanemia.

Musculoskeletal effects include: joint contractures of the elbows and interphalangeal joints of the fingers and thumbs (specifically the distal phalanges), pes planus (fallen arches), an ulnar drift affecting the fingers of both hands (an unusual, yet correctible feature where the fingers slant toward the ulnar side of the forearm), joint pain and laxity, and adduction of the thumbs (where the thumb appears drawn into the palm, related to contracture of the adductor pollicis).

Behavioral, developmental and other anomalies often include: hypersexuality, perceptual hypersensitivity, emotional lability (mood swings), hyperaggressive behavior; hypertelorism (widely-set eyes), optical strabismus (misalignment) and myopia.

Metabolically, hypertryptophanemia results in tryptophanuria and exhibits significantly elevated serum levels of tryptophan, exceeding 650% of maximum (normal range: 25–73 micromole/l) in some instances.

A product of the bacterial biosynthesis of tryptophan is indole. The excess of tryptophan in hypertryptophanemia also results in substantial excretion of indoleic acids. These findings suggest a possible congenital defect in the metabolic pathway where tryptophan is converted to kynurenine.

Kynurenine, a metabolite of tryptophan

== Genetics ==
Familial hypertryptophanemia has an autosomal recessive pattern of inheritance.

Hypertryptophanemia is believed to be inherited in an autosomal recessive manner. This means a defective gene responsible for the disorder is located on an autosome, and two copies of the defective gene (one inherited from each parent) are required in order to be born with the disorder. The parents of an individual with an autosomal recessive disorder both carry one copy of the defective gene, but usually do not experience any signs or symptoms of the disorder.

== Pathophysiology ==
At present, no specific enzyme deficiency nor genetic mutation has been implicated as the cause of hypertryptophanemia. Several known factors regarding tryptophan metabolism and kynurenines, however, may explain the presence of behavioral abnormalities seen with the disorder.

Tryptophan is an essential amino acid, and is required for protein synthesis. Aside from this crucial role, the remainder of tryptophan is primarily metabolized along the kynurenine pathway in most tissues, including those of the brain and central nervous system.

As the main defect behind hypertryptophanemia is suspected to alter and disrupt the metabolic pathway from tryptophan to kynurenine, a possible correlation between hypertryptophanemia and the known effects of kynurenines on neuronal function, physiology and behavior may be of interest.

One of these kynurenines, aptly named kynurenic acid, serves as a neuroprotectant through its function as an antagonist at both nicotinic and glutamate receptors (responsive to the neurotransmitters nicotine and glutamate, respectively). This action is in opposition to the agonist quinolinic acid, another kynurenine, noted for its potential as a neurotoxin. Quinolinic acid activity has been associated with neurodegenerative disorders such as Huntington's disease, the neuroprective abilities of kynurenic acid forming a counterbalance against this process, and the related excitotoxicity and similar damaging effects on neurons.

Indoleic acid excretion is another indicator of hypertryptophanemia. Indirectly related to kynurenine metabolism, indole modifies neural function and human behavior by interacting with voltage-dependent sodium channels (integral membrane proteins that form ion channels, allowing vital synaptic action potentials).

== See also ==
- Blue diaper syndrome
- Tryptamine
- Serotonin
