= Nasal hair =

Hair in the nostrils of adult humans

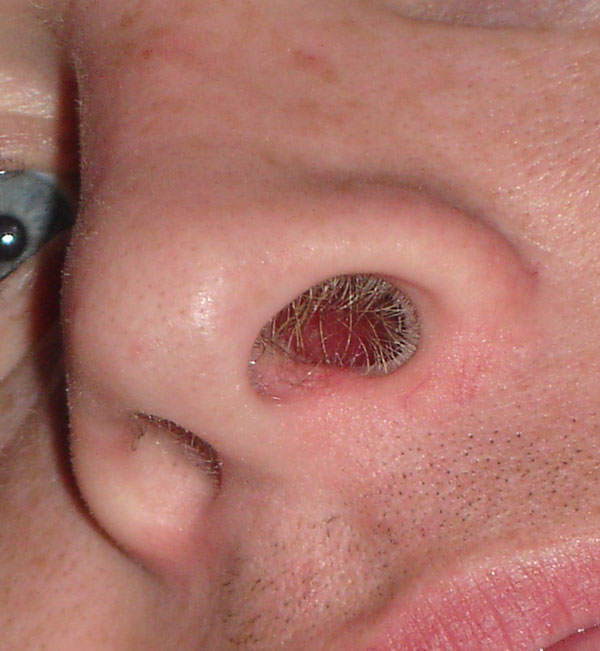
Nasal hair

Nasal hair or nose hair is the hair in the nostril. Adult human noses have hairs, which serve as a crude air filter to stop foreign particles from entering the nasal cavity, as well as to help collect moisture. Nasal hair is different from the cilia of the ciliated lining of the nasal cavity. These cilia are microtubule-based structures that are found in the respiratory tract, involved in the mucociliary clearance mechanism.

== Functions ==
A 2011 study indicated that increased nasal hair density decreases the development of asthma in those who have allergic rhinitis, possibly due to an increased trapping capacity to filter out pollen and other common allergens.

== Removal ==
A number of devices have been sold to trim nasal hair, including miniature rotary clippers and attachments for electric shavers. The trimmers shorten the hair to such lengths that they do not appear outside of the nasal passage. A pair of tweezers may also be used to facilitate the removal of such hairs. Other means are in effect such as waxing, laser hair removal, and electrolysis.
