= X-linked adrenal hypoplasia congenita =

- Specialty: Endocrinology

X-linked adrenal hypoplasia congenita is a genetic disorder that mainly affects males. It involves many endocrine tissues in the body, especially the adrenal glands.

== Presentation ==
One of the main characteristics of this disorder is adrenal insufficiency, which is a reduction in adrenal gland function resulting from incomplete development of the gland's outer layer (the adrenal cortex). Adrenal insufficiency typically begins in infancy or in childhood and can cause vomiting, difficulty with feeding, dehydration, extremely low blood sugar (hypoglycemia), low sodium levels, and shock. However, adult-onset cases have also been described. See also Addison's disease.

Affected males may also lack male sex hormones, which leads to underdeveloped reproductive tissues, undescended testicles (cryptorchidism), delayed puberty, and an inability to father children (infertility). These characteristics are known as hypogonadotropic hypogonadism. Females are rarely affected by this disorder, but a few cases have been reported of adrenal insufficiency or a lack of female sex hormones, resulting in underdeveloped reproductive tissues, delayed puberty, and an absence of menstruation.

== Genetics ==
Mutations in the NR0B1 gene located on the X chromosome (Xp21.3-p21.2) cause X-linked adrenal hypoplasia congenita. The NR0B1 gene provides instructions to make a transcription factor protein called DAX1 that helps control the activity of certain genes. When the NR0B1 gene is deleted or mutated, the activity of certain genes is not properly controlled. This leads to problems with the development of the adrenal glands, two structures in the brain (the hypothalamus and pituitary gland), and reproductive tissues (the ovaries or testes). These tissues are important for the production of many hormones that control various functions in the body. When these hormones are not present in the correct amounts, the signs and symptoms of adrenal insufficiency and hypogonadotropic hypogonadism can result. This condition is inherited in an X-linked recessive pattern.
